A metalloid is a type of chemical element which has a preponderance of properties in between, or that are a mixture of, those of metals and nonmetals. There is no standard definition of a metalloid and no complete agreement on which elements are metalloids. Despite the lack of specificity, the term remains in use in the literature of chemistry.

The six commonly recognised metalloids are boron, silicon, germanium, arsenic, antimony and tellurium. Five elements are less frequently so classified: carbon, aluminium, selenium, polonium and astatine. On a standard periodic table, all eleven elements are in a diagonal region of the p-block extending from boron at the upper left to astatine at lower right. Some periodic tables include a dividing line between metals and nonmetals, and the metalloids may be found close to this line.

Typical metalloids have a metallic appearance, but they are brittle and only fair conductors of electricity. Chemically, they behave mostly as nonmetals. They can form alloys with metals. Most of their other physical properties and chemical properties are intermediate in nature. Metalloids are usually too brittle to have any structural uses. They and their compounds are used in alloys, biological agents, catalysts, flame retardants, glasses, optical storage and optoelectronics, pyrotechnics, semiconductors, and electronics.

The electrical properties of silicon and germanium enabled the establishment of the semiconductor industry in the 1950s and the development of solid-state electronics from the early 1960s.

The term metalloid originally referred to nonmetals. Its more recent meaning, as a category of elements with intermediate or hybrid properties, became widespread in 1940–1960. Metalloids are sometimes called semimetals, a practice that has been discouraged, as the term semimetal has a different meaning in physics than in chemistry. In physics, it refers to a specific kind of electronic band structure of a substance. In this context, only arsenic and antimony are semimetals, and commonly recognised as metalloids.

Definitions

Judgment-based
A metalloid is an element that possesses a preponderance of properties in between, or that are a mixture of, those of metals and nonmetals, and which is therefore hard to classify as either a metal or a nonmetal. This is a generic definition that draws on metalloid attributes consistently cited in the literature. Difficulty of categorisation is a key attribute. Most elements have a mixture of metallic and nonmetallic properties, and can be classified according to which set of properties is more pronounced. Only the elements at or near the margins, lacking a sufficiently clear preponderance of either metallic or nonmetallic properties, are classified as metalloids.

Boron, silicon, germanium, arsenic, antimony, and tellurium are commonly recognised as metalloids. Depending on the author, one or more from selenium, polonium, or astatine are sometimes added to the list. Boron sometimes is excluded, by itself, or with silicon. Sometimes tellurium is not regarded as a metalloid. The inclusion of antimony, polonium, and astatine as metalloids has been questioned.

Other elements are occasionally classified as metalloids. These elements include hydrogen, beryllium, nitrogen, phosphorus, sulfur, zinc, gallium, tin, iodine, lead, bismuth, and radon. The term metalloid has also been used for elements that exhibit metallic lustre and electrical conductivity, and that are amphoteric, such as arsenic, antimony, vanadium, chromium, molybdenum, tungsten, tin, lead, and aluminium. The p-block metals, and nonmetals (such as carbon or nitrogen) that can form alloys with metals or modify their properties have also occasionally been considered as metalloids.

Criteria-based

No widely accepted definition of a metalloid exists, nor any division of the periodic table into metals, metalloids, and nonmetals; Hawkes questioned the feasibility of establishing a specific definition, noting that anomalies can be found in several attempted constructs. Classifying an element as a metalloid has been described by Sharp as "arbitrary".

The number and identities of metalloids depend on what classification criteria are used. Emsley recognised four metalloids (germanium, arsenic, antimony, and tellurium); James et al. listed twelve (Emsley's plus boron, carbon, silicon, selenium, bismuth, polonium, moscovium, and livermorium). On average, seven elements are included in such lists; individual classification arrangements tend to share common ground and vary in the ill-defined margins.

A single quantitative criterion such as electronegativity is commonly used, metalloids having electronegativity values from 1.8 or 1.9 to 2.2. Further examples include packing efficiency (the fraction of volume in a crystal structure occupied by atoms) and the Goldhammer-Herzfeld criterion ratio. The commonly recognised metalloids have packing efficiencies of between 34% and 41%. The Goldhammer-Herzfeld ratio, roughly equal to the cube of the atomic radius divided by the molar volume, is a simple measure of how metallic an element is, the recognised metalloids having ratios from around 0.85 to 1.1 and averaging 1.0.
Other authors have relied on, for example, atomic conductance or bulk coordination number.

Jones, writing on the role of classification in science, observed that "[classes] are usually defined by more than two attributes". Masterton and Slowinski used three criteria to describe the six elements commonly recognised as metalloids: metalloids have ionization energies around 200 kcal/mol (837 kJ/mol) and electronegativity values close to 2.0. They also said that metalloids are typically semiconductors, though antimony and arsenic (semimetals from a physics perspective) have electrical conductivities approaching those of metals. Selenium and polonium are suspected as not in this scheme, while astatine's status is uncertain.

In this context, Vernon proposed that a metalloid is a chemical element that, in its standard state, has (a) the electronic band structure  of a semiconductor or a semimetal; and (b) an intermediate first ionization potential "(say 750−1,000 kJ/mol)"; and (c) an intermediate electronegativity (1.9–2.2).

Periodic table territory

Location
Metalloids lie on either side of the dividing line between metals and nonmetals. This can be found, in varying configurations, on some periodic tables. Elements to the lower left of the line generally display increasing metallic behaviour; elements to the upper right display increasing nonmetallic behaviour. When presented as a regular stairstep, elements with the highest critical temperature for their groups (Li, Be, Al, Ge, Sb, Po) lie just below the line.

The diagonal positioning of the metalloids represents an exception to the observation that elements with similar properties tend to occur in vertical groups. A related effect can be seen in other diagonal similarities between some elements and their lower right neighbours, specifically lithium-magnesium, beryllium-aluminium, and boron-silicon. Rayner-Canham has argued that these similarities extend to carbon-phosphorus, nitrogen-sulfur, and into three d-block series.

This exception arises due to competing horizontal and vertical trends in the nuclear charge. Going along a period, the nuclear charge increases with atomic number as do the number of electrons. The additional pull on outer electrons as nuclear charge increases generally outweighs the screening effect of having more electrons. With some irregularities, atoms therefore become smaller, ionization energy increases, and there is a gradual change in character, across a period, from strongly metallic, to weakly metallic, to weakly nonmetallic, to strongly nonmetallic elements. Going down a main group, the effect of increasing nuclear charge is generally outweighed by the effect of additional electrons being further away from the nucleus. Atoms generally become larger, ionization energy falls, and metallic character increases. The net effect is that the location of the metal–nonmetal transition zone shifts to the right in going down a group, and analogous diagonal similarities are seen elsewhere in the periodic table, as noted.

Alternative treatments
Elements bordering the metal–nonmetal dividing line are not always classified as metalloids, noting a binary classification can facilitate the establishment of rules for determining bond types between metals and nonmetals. In such cases, the authors concerned focus on one or more attributes of interest to make their classification decisions, rather than being concerned about the marginal nature of the elements in question. Their considerations may or not be made explicit and may, at times, seem arbitrary. Metalloids may be grouped with metals; or regarded as nonmetals; or treated as a sub-category of nonmetals. Other authors have suggested classifying some elements as metalloids "emphasizes that properties change gradually rather than abruptly as one moves across or down the periodic table". Some periodic tables distinguish elements that are metalloids and display no formal dividing line between metals and nonmetals. Metalloids are instead shown as occurring in a diagonal band or diffuse region. The key consideration is to explain the context for the taxonomy in use.

Properties
Metalloids usually look like metals but behave largely like nonmetals. Physically, they are shiny, brittle solids with intermediate to relatively good electrical conductivity and the electronic band structure of a semimetal or semiconductor. Chemically, they mostly behave as (weak) nonmetals, have intermediate ionization energies and electronegativity values, and amphoteric or weakly acidic oxides. They can form alloys with metals. Most of their other physical and chemical properties are intermediate in nature.

Compared to metals and nonmetals

Characteristic properties of metals, metalloids, and nonmetals are summarized in the table. Physical properties are listed in order of ease of determination; chemical properties run from general to specific, and then to descriptive.

The above table reflects the hybrid nature of metalloids. The properties of form, appearance, and behaviour when mixed with metals are more like metals. Elasticity and general chemical behaviour are more like nonmetals. Electrical conductivity, band structure, ionization energy, electronegativity, and oxides are intermediate between the two.

Common applications
The focus of this section is on the recognised metalloids. Elements less often recognised as metalloids are ordinarily classified as either metals or nonmetals; some of these are included here for comparative purposes.
Metalloids are too brittle to have any structural uses in their pure forms. They and their compounds are used as (or in) alloying components, biological agents (toxicological, nutritional, and medicinal), catalysts, flame retardants, glasses (oxide and metallic), optical storage media and optoelectronics, pyrotechnics, semiconductors, and electronics.

Alloys

Writing early in the history of intermetallic compounds, the British metallurgist Cecil Desch observed that "certain non-metallic elements are capable of forming compounds of distinctly metallic character with metals, and these elements may therefore enter into the composition of alloys". He associated silicon, arsenic, and tellurium, in particular, with the alloy-forming elements. Phillips and Williams suggested that compounds of silicon, germanium, arsenic, and antimony with B metals, "are probably best classed as alloys".

Among the lighter metalloids, alloys with transition metals are well-represented. Boron can form intermetallic compounds and alloys with such metals of the composition MnB, if n > 2. Ferroboron (15% boron) is used to introduce boron into steel; nickel-boron alloys are ingredients in welding alloys and case hardening compositions for the engineering industry. Alloys of silicon with iron and with aluminium are widely used by the steel and automotive industries, respectively. Germanium forms many alloys, most importantly with the coinage metals.

The heavier metalloids continue the theme. Arsenic can form alloys with metals, including platinum and copper; it is also added to copper and its alloys to improve corrosion resistance and appears to confer the same benefit when added to magnesium. Antimony is well known as an alloy-former, including with the coinage metals. Its alloys include pewter (a tin alloy with up to 20% antimony) and type metal (a lead alloy with up to 25% antimony). Tellurium readily alloys with iron, as ferrotellurium (50–58% tellurium), and with copper, in the form of copper tellurium (40–50% tellurium). Ferrotellurium is used as a stabilizer for carbon in steel casting. Of the non-metallic elements less often recognised as metalloids, selenium – in the form of ferroselenium (50–58% selenium) – is used to improve the machinability of stainless steels.

Biological agents
 All six of the elements commonly recognised as metalloids have toxic, dietary or medicinal properties. Arsenic and antimony compounds are especially toxic; boron, silicon, and possibly arsenic, are essential trace elements. Boron, silicon, arsenic, and antimony have medical applications, and germanium and tellurium are thought to have potential.

Boron is used in insecticides and herbicides. It is an essential trace element. As boric acid, it has antiseptic, antifungal, and antiviral properties.

Silicon is present in silatrane, a highly toxic rodenticide. Long-term inhalation of silica dust causes silicosis, a fatal disease of the lungs. Silicon is an essential trace element. Silicone gel can be applied to badly burned patients to reduce scarring.

Salts of germanium are potentially harmful to humans and animals if ingested on a prolonged basis. There is interest in the pharmacological actions of germanium compounds but no licensed medicine as yet.

Arsenic is notoriously poisonous and may also be an essential element in ultratrace amounts. During World War I, both sides used "arsenic-based sneezing and vomiting agents…to force enemy soldiers to remove their gas masks before firing mustard or phosgene at them in a second salvo." It has been used as a pharmaceutical agent since antiquity, including for the treatment of syphilis before the development of antibiotics. Arsenic is also a component of melarsoprol, a medicinal drug used in the treatment of human African trypanosomiasis or sleeping sickness. In 2003, arsenic trioxide (under the trade name Trisenox) was re-introduced for the treatment of acute promyelocytic leukaemia, a cancer of the blood and bone marrow. Arsenic in drinking water, which causes lung and bladder cancer, has been associated with a reduction in breast cancer mortality rates.

Metallic antimony is relatively non-toxic, but most antimony compounds are poisonous.
Two antimony compounds, sodium stibogluconate and stibophen, are used as antiparasitical drugs.

Elemental tellurium is not considered particularly toxic; two grams of sodium tellurate, if administered, can be lethal. People exposed to small amounts of airborne tellurium exude a foul and persistent garlic-like odour. Tellurium dioxide has been used to treat seborrhoeic dermatitis; other tellurium compounds were used as antimicrobial agents before the development of antibiotics. In the future, such compounds may need to be substituted for antibiotics that have become ineffective due to bacterial resistance.

Of the elements less often recognised as metalloids, beryllium and lead are noted for their toxicity; lead arsenate has been extensively used as an insecticide. Sulfur is one of the oldest of the fungicides and pesticides. Phosphorus, sulfur, zinc, selenium, and iodine are essential nutrients, and aluminium, tin, and lead may be. Sulfur, gallium, selenium, iodine, and bismuth have medicinal applications. Sulfur is a constituent of sulfonamide drugs, still widely used for conditions such as acne and urinary tract infections. Gallium nitrate is used to treat the side effects of cancer; gallium citrate, a radiopharmaceutical, facilitates imaging of inflamed body areas. Selenium sulfide is used in medicinal shampoos and to treat skin infections such as tinea versicolor. Iodine is used as a disinfectant in various forms. Bismuth is an ingredient in some antibacterials.

Catalysts
Boron trifluoride and trichloride are used as catalysts in organic synthesis and electronics; the tribromide is used in the manufacture of diborane. Non-toxic boron ligands could replace toxic phosphorus ligands in some transition metal catalysts. Silica sulfuric acid (SiO2OSO3H) is used in organic reactions. Germanium dioxide is sometimes used as a catalyst in the production of PET plastic for containers; cheaper antimony compounds, such as the trioxide or triacetate, are more commonly employed for the same purpose despite concerns about antimony contamination of food and drinks. Arsenic trioxide has been used in the production of natural gas, to boost the removal of carbon dioxide, as have selenous acid and tellurous acid. Selenium acts as a catalyst in some microorganisms. Tellurium, its dioxide, and its tetrachloride are strong catalysts for air oxidation of carbon above 500 °C. Graphite oxide can be used as a catalyst in the synthesis of imines and their derivatives. Activated carbon and alumina have been used as catalysts for the removal of sulfur contaminants from natural gas. Titanium doped aluminium has been identified as a substitute for expensive noble metal catalysts used in the production of industrial chemicals.

Flame retardants
Compounds of boron, silicon, arsenic, and antimony have been used as flame retardants. Boron, in the form of borax, has been used as a textile flame retardant since at least the 18th century. Silicon compounds such as silicones, silanes, silsesquioxane, silica, and silicates, some of which were developed as alternatives to more toxic halogenated products, can considerably improve the flame retardancy of plastic materials.
Arsenic compounds such as sodium arsenite or sodium arsenate are effective flame retardants for wood but have been less frequently used due to their toxicity. Antimony trioxide is a flame retardant. Aluminium hydroxide has been used as a wood-fibre, rubber, plastic, and textile flame retardant since the 1890s. Apart from aluminium hydroxide, use of phosphorus based flame-retardants – in the form of, for example, organophosphates – now exceeds that of any of the other main retardant types. These employ boron, antimony, or halogenated hydrocarbon compounds.

Glass formation

The oxides B2O3, SiO2, GeO2, As2O3, and Sb2O3 readily form glasses. TeO2 forms a glass but this requires a "heroic quench rate" or the addition of an impurity; otherwise the crystalline form results. These compounds are used in chemical, domestic, and industrial glassware and optics. Boron trioxide is used as a glass fibre additive, and is also a component of borosilicate glass, widely used for laboratory glassware and domestic ovenware for its low thermal expansion. Most ordinary glassware is made from silicon dioxide. Germanium dioxide is used as a glass fibre additive, as well as in infrared optical systems. Arsenic trioxide is used in the glass industry as a decolourizing and fining agent (for the removal of bubbles), as is antimony trioxide. Tellurium dioxide finds application in laser and nonlinear optics.

Amorphous metallic glasses are generally most easily prepared if one of the components is a metalloid or "near metalloid" such as boron, carbon, silicon, phosphorus or germanium. Aside from thin films deposited at very low temperatures, the first known metallic glass was an alloy of composition Au75Si25 reported in 1960. A metallic glass having a strength and toughness not previously seen, of composition Pd82.5P6Si9.5Ge2, was reported in 2011.

Phosphorus, selenium, and lead, which are less often recognised as metalloids, are also used in glasses. Phosphate glass has a substrate of phosphorus pentoxide (P2O5), rather than the silica (SiO2) of conventional silicate glasses. It is used, for example, to make sodium lamps. Selenium compounds can be used both as decolourising agents and to add a red colour to glass. Decorative glassware made of traditional lead glass contains at least 30% lead(II) oxide (PbO); lead glass used for radiation shielding may have up to 65% PbO. Lead-based glasses have also been extensively used in electronic components, enamelling, sealing and glazing materials, and solar cells. Bismuth based oxide glasses have emerged as a less toxic replacement for lead in many of these applications.

Optical storage and optoelectronics
Varying compositions of GeSbTe ("GST alloys") and Ag- and In- doped Sb2Te ("AIST alloys"), being examples of phase-change materials, are widely used in rewritable optical discs and phase-change memory devices. By applying heat, they can be switched between amorphous (glassy) and crystalline states. The change in optical and electrical properties can be used for information storage purposes. Future applications for GeSbTe may include, "ultrafast, entirely solid-state displays with nanometre-scale pixels, semi-transparent 'smart' glasses, 'smart' contact lenses, and artificial retina devices."

Pyrotechnics

The recognised metalloids have either pyrotechnic applications or associated properties. Boron and silicon are commonly encountered; they act somewhat like metal fuels. Boron is used in pyrotechnic initiator compositions (for igniting other hard-to-start compositions), and in delay compositions that burn at a constant rate. Boron carbide has been identified as a possible replacement for more toxic barium or hexachloroethane mixtures in smoke munitions, signal flares, and fireworks. Silicon, like boron, is a component of initiator and delay mixtures. Doped germanium can act as a variable speed thermite fuel. Arsenic trisulfide As2S3 was used in old naval signal lights; in fireworks to make white stars; in yellow smoke screen mixtures; and in initiator compositions. Antimony trisulfide Sb2S3 is found in white-light fireworks and in flash and sound mixtures. Tellurium has been used in delay mixtures and in blasting cap initiator compositions.

Carbon, aluminium, phosphorus, and selenium continue the theme. Carbon, in black powder, is a constituent of fireworks rocket propellants, bursting charges, and effects mixtures, and military delay fuses and igniters. Aluminium is a common pyrotechnic ingredient, and is widely employed for its capacity to generate light and heat, including in thermite mixtures. Phosphorus can be found in smoke and incendiary munitions, paper caps used in toy guns, and party poppers. Selenium has been used in the same way as tellurium.

Semiconductors and electronics

All the elements commonly recognised as metalloids (or their compounds) have been used in the semiconductor or solid-state electronic industries.

Some properties of boron have limited its use as a semiconductor. It has a high melting point, single crystals are relatively hard to obtain, and introducing and retaining controlled impurities is difficult.

Silicon is the leading commercial semiconductor; it forms the basis of modern electronics (including standard solar cells) and information and communication technologies. This was despite the study of semiconductors, early in the 20th century, having been regarded as the "physics of dirt" and not deserving of close attention.

Germanium has largely been replaced by silicon in semiconducting devices, being cheaper, more resilient at higher operating temperatures, and easier to work during the microelectronic fabrication process. Germanium is still a constituent of semiconducting silicon-germanium "alloys" and these have been growing in use, particularly for wireless communication devices; such alloys exploit the higher carrier mobility of germanium. The synthesis of gram-scale quantities of semiconducting germanane was reported in 2013. This consists of one-atom thick sheets of hydrogen-terminated germanium atoms, analogous to graphane. It conducts electrons more than ten times faster than silicon and five times faster than germanium, and is thought to have potential for optoelectronic and sensing applications. The development of a germanium-wire based anode that more than doubles the capacity of lithium-ion batteries was reported in 2014. In the same year, Lee et al. reported that defect-free crystals of graphene large enough to have electronic uses could be grown on, and removed from, a germanium substrate.

Arsenic and antimony are not semiconductors in their standard states. Both form type III-V semiconductors (such as GaAs, AlSb or GaInAsSb) in which the average number of valence electrons per atom is the same as that of Group 14 elements. These compounds are preferred for some special applications. Antimony nanocrystals may enable lithium-ion batteries to be replaced by more powerful sodium ion batteries.

Tellurium, which is a semiconductor in its standard state, is used mainly as a component in type II/VI semiconducting-chalcogenides; these have applications in electro-optics and electronics. Cadmium telluride (CdTe) is used in solar modules for its high conversion efficiency, low manufacturing costs, and large band gap of 1.44 eV, letting it absorb a wide range of wavelengths. Bismuth telluride (Bi2Te3), alloyed with selenium and antimony, is a component of thermoelectric devices used for refrigeration or portable power generation.

Five metalloids – boron, silicon, germanium, arsenic, and antimony – can be found in cell phones (along with at least 39 other metals and nonmetals). Tellurium is expected to find such use. Of the less often recognised metalloids, phosphorus, gallium (in particular) and selenium have semiconductor applications. Phosphorus is used in trace amounts as a dopant for n-type semiconductors. The commercial use of gallium compounds is dominated by semiconductor applications –  in integrated circuits, cell phones, laser diodes, light-emitting diodes, photodetectors, and solar cells. Selenium is used in the production of solar cells and in high-energy surge protectors.

Boron, silicon, germanium, antimony, and tellurium, as well as heavier metals and metalloids such as Sm, Hg, Tl, Pb, Bi, and Se, can be found in topological insulators. These are alloys or compounds which, at ultracold temperatures or room temperature (depending on their composition), are metallic conductors on their surfaces but insulators through their interiors. Cadmium arsenide Cd3As2, at about 1 K, is a Dirac-semimetal – a bulk electronic analogue of graphene – in which electrons travel effectively as massless particles. These two classes of material are thought to have potential quantum computing applications.

Nomenclature and history

Derivation and other names
The word metalloid comes from the Latin metallum ("metal") and the Greek oeides ("resembling in form or appearance"). Several names are sometimes used synonymously although some of these have other meanings that are not necessarily interchangeable: amphoteric element, boundary element, half-metal, half-way element, near metal, meta-metal, semiconductor, semimetal and submetal. "Amphoteric element" is sometimes used more broadly to include transition metals capable of forming oxyanions, such as chromium and manganese. "Half-metal" is used in physics to refer to a compound (such as chromium dioxide) or alloy that can act as a conductor and an insulator. "Meta-metal" is sometimes used instead to refer to certain metals (Be, Zn, Cd, Hg, In, Tl, β-Sn, Pb) located just to the left of the metalloids on standard periodic tables. These metals are mostly diamagnetic and tend to have distorted crystalline structures, electrical conductivity values at the lower end of those of metals, and amphoteric (weakly basic) oxides. "Semimetal" sometimes refers, loosely or explicitly, to metals with incomplete metallic character in crystalline structure, electrical conductivity or electronic structure. Examples include gallium, ytterbium, bismuth and neptunium. The names amphoteric element and semiconductor are problematic as some elements referred to as metalloids do not show marked amphoteric behaviour (bismuth, for example) or semiconductivity (polonium) in their most stable forms.

Origin and usage

The origin and usage of the term metalloid is convoluted. Its origin lies in attempts, dating from antiquity, to describe metals and to distinguish between typical and less typical forms. It was first applied in the early 19th century to metals that floated on water (sodium and potassium), and then more popularly to nonmetals. Earlier usage in mineralogy, to describe a mineral having a metallic appearance, can be sourced to as early as 1800. Since the mid-20th century it has been used to refer to intermediate or borderline chemical elements. The International Union of Pure and Applied Chemistry (IUPAC) previously recommended abandoning the term metalloid, and suggested using the term semimetal instead. Use of this latter term has more recently been discouraged by Atkins et al. as it has a different meaning in physics – one that more specifically refers to the electronic band structure of a substance rather than the overall classification of an element. The most recent IUPAC publications on nomenclature and terminology do not include any recommendations on the usage of the terms metalloid or semimetal.

Elements commonly recognised as metalloids
Properties noted in this section refer to the elements in their most thermodynamically stable forms under ambient conditions.

Boron

 Pure boron is a shiny, silver-grey crystalline solid. It is less dense than aluminium (2.34 vs. 2.70 g/cm3), and is hard and brittle. It is barely reactive under normal conditions, except for attack by fluorine, and has a melting point of 2076 °C (cf. steel ~1370 °C). Boron is a semiconductor; its room temperature electrical conductivity is 1.5 × 10−6 S•cm−1 (about 200 times less than that of tap water) and it has a band gap of about 1.56 eV. Mendeleev commented that, "Boron appears in a free state in several forms which are intermediate between the metals and the nonmmetals."
The structural chemistry of boron is dominated by its small atomic size, and relatively high ionization energy. With only three valence electrons per boron atom, simple covalent bonding cannot fulfil the octet rule. Metallic bonding is the usual result among the heavier congenors of boron but this generally requires low ionization energies. Instead, because of its small size and high ionization energies, the basic structural unit of boron (and nearly all of its allotropes) is the icosahedral B12 cluster. Of the 36 electrons associated with 12 boron atoms, 26 reside in 13 delocalized molecular orbitals; the other 10 electrons are used to form two- and three-centre covalent bonds between icosahedra. The same motif can be seen, as are deltahedral variants or fragments, in metal borides and hydride derivatives, and in some halides.

The bonding in boron has been described as being characteristic of behaviour intermediate between metals and nonmetallic covalent network solids (such as diamond). The energy required to transform B, C, N, Si, and P from nonmetallic to metallic states has been estimated as 30, 100, 240, 33, and 50 kJ/mol, respectively. This indicates the proximity of boron to the metal-nonmetal borderline.

Most of the chemistry of boron is nonmetallic in nature. Unlike its heavier congeners, it is not known to form a simple B3+ or hydrated [B(H2O)4]3+ cation. The small size of the boron atom enables the preparation of many interstitial alloy-type borides. Analogies between boron and transition metals have been noted in the formation of complexes, and adducts (for example, BH3 + CO →BH3CO and, similarly, Fe(CO)4 + CO →Fe(CO)5), as well as in the geometric and electronic structures of cluster species such as [B6H6]2− and [Ru6(CO)18]2−. The aqueous chemistry of boron is characterised by the formation of many different polyborate anions. Given its high charge-to-size ratio, boron bonds covalently in nearly all of its compounds; the exceptions are the borides as these include, depending on their composition, covalent, ionic, and metallic bonding components. Simple binary compounds, such as boron trichloride are Lewis acids as the formation of three covalent bonds leaves a hole in the octet which can be filled by an electron-pair donated by a Lewis base. Boron has a strong affinity for oxygen and a duly extensive borate chemistry. The oxide B2O3 is polymeric in structure, weakly acidic, and a glass former. Organometallic compounds of boron have been known since the 19th century (see organoboron chemistry).

Silicon

Silicon is a crystalline solid with a blue-grey metallic lustre. Like boron, it is less dense (at 2.33 g/cm3) than aluminium, and is hard and brittle. It is a relatively unreactive element. According to Rochow, the massive crystalline form (especially if pure) is "remarkably inert to all acids, including hydrofluoric". Less pure silicon, and the powdered form, are variously susceptible to attack by strong or heated acids, as well as by steam and fluorine. Silicon dissolves in hot aqueous alkalis with the evolution of hydrogen, as do metals such as beryllium, aluminium, zinc, gallium or indium. It melts at 1414 °C. Silicon is a semiconductor with an electrical conductivity of 10−4 S•cm−1 and a band gap of about 1.11 eV. When it melts, silicon becomes a reasonable metal with an electrical conductivity of 1.0–1.3 × 104 S•cm−1, similar to that of liquid mercury.

The chemistry of silicon is generally nonmetallic (covalent) in nature. It is not known to form a cation. Silicon can form alloys with metals such as iron and copper. It shows fewer tendencies to anionic behaviour than ordinary nonmetals. Its solution chemistry is characterised by the formation of oxyanions. The high strength of the silicon–oxygen bond dominates the chemical behaviour of silicon. Polymeric silicates, built up by tetrahedral SiO4 units sharing their oxygen atoms, are the most abundant and important compounds of silicon. The polymeric borates, comprising linked trigonal and tetrahedral BO3 or BO4 units, are built on similar structural principles. The oxide SiO2 is polymeric in structure, weakly acidic, and a glass former. Traditional organometallic chemistry includes the carbon compounds of silicon (see organosilicon).

Germanium

Germanium is a shiny grey-white solid. It has a density of 5.323 g/cm3 and is hard and brittle. It is mostly unreactive at room temperature but is slowly attacked by hot concentrated sulfuric or nitric acid. Germanium also reacts with molten caustic soda to yield sodium germanate Na2GeO3 and hydrogen gas. It melts at 938 °C. Germanium is a semiconductor with an electrical conductivity of around 2 × 10−2 S•cm−1 and a band gap of 0.67 eV. Liquid germanium is a metallic conductor, with an electrical conductivity similar to that of liquid mercury.

Most of the chemistry of germanium is characteristic of a nonmetal. Whether or not germanium forms a cation is unclear, aside from the reported existence of the Ge2+ ion in a few esoteric compounds. It can form alloys with metals such as aluminium and gold. It shows fewer tendencies to anionic behaviour than ordinary nonmetals. Its solution chemistry is characterised by the formation of oxyanions. Germanium generally forms tetravalent (IV) compounds, and it can also form less stable divalent (II) compounds, in which it behaves more like a metal. Germanium analogues of all of the major types of silicates have been prepared. The metallic character of germanium is also suggested by the formation of various oxoacid salts. A phosphate [(HPO4)2Ge·H2O] and highly stable trifluoroacetate Ge(OCOCF3)4 have been described, as have Ge2(SO4)2, Ge(ClO4)4 and GeH2(C2O4)3. The oxide GeO2 is polymeric, amphoteric, and a glass former. The dioxide is soluble in acidic solutions (the monoxide GeO, is even more so), and this is sometimes used to classify germanium as a metal. Up to the 1930s germanium was considered to be a poorly conducting metal; it has occasionally been classified as a metal by later writers. As with all the elements commonly recognised as metalloids, germanium has an established organometallic chemistry (see Organogermanium chemistry).

Arsenic

Arsenic is a grey, metallic looking solid. It has a density of 5.727 g/cm3 and is brittle, and moderately hard (more than aluminium; less than iron). It is stable in dry air but develops a golden bronze patina in moist air, which blackens on further exposure. Arsenic is attacked by nitric acid and concentrated sulfuric acid. It reacts with fused caustic soda to give the arsenate Na3AsO3 and hydrogen gas. Arsenic sublimes at 615 °C. The vapour is lemon-yellow and smells like garlic. Arsenic only melts under a pressure of 38.6 atm, at 817 °C. It is a semimetal with an electrical conductivity of around 3.9 × 104 S•cm−1 and a band overlap of 0.5 eV. Liquid arsenic is a semiconductor with a band gap of 0.15 eV.

The chemistry of arsenic is predominately nonmetallic. Whether or not arsenic forms a cation is unclear. Its many metal alloys are mostly brittle. It shows fewer tendencies to anionic behaviour than ordinary nonmetals. Its solution chemistry is characterised by the formation of oxyanions. Arsenic generally forms compounds in which it has an oxidation state of +3 or +5. The halides, and the oxides and their derivatives are illustrative examples. In the trivalent state, arsenic shows some incipient metallic properties. The halides are hydrolysed by water but these reactions, particularly those of the chloride, are reversible with the addition of a hydrohalic acid. The oxide is acidic but, as noted below, (weakly) amphoteric. The higher, less stable, pentavalent state has strongly acidic (nonmetallic) properties. Compared to phosphorus, the stronger metallic character of arsenic is indicated by the formation of oxoacid salts such as AsPO4, As2(SO4)3 and arsenic acetate As(CH3COO)3. The oxide As2O3 is polymeric, amphoteric, and a glass former. Arsenic has an extensive organometallic chemistry (see Organoarsenic chemistry).

Antimony

Antimony is a silver-white solid with a blue tint and a brilliant lustre. It has a density of 6.697 g/cm3 and is brittle, and moderately hard (more so than arsenic; less so than iron; about the same as copper). It is stable in air and moisture at room temperature. It is attacked by concentrated nitric acid, yielding the hydrated pentoxide Sb2O5. Aqua regia gives the pentachloride SbCl5 and hot concentrated sulfuric acid results in the sulfate Sb2(SO4)3. It is not affected by molten alkali. Antimony is capable of displacing hydrogen from water, when heated:  2 Sb + 3 H2O → Sb2O3 + 3 H2. It melts at 631 °C. Antimony is a semimetal with an electrical conductivity of around 3.1 × 104 S•cm−1 and a band overlap of 0.16 eV. Liquid antimony is a metallic conductor with an electrical conductivity of around 5.3 × 104 S•cm−1.

Most of the chemistry of antimony is characteristic of a nonmetal. Antimony has some definite cationic chemistry, SbO+ and Sb(OH)2+ being present in acidic aqueous solution; the compound Sb8(GaCl4)2, which contains the homopolycation, Sb82+, was prepared in 2004. It can form alloys with one or more metals such as aluminium, iron, nickel, copper, zinc, tin, lead, and bismuth. Antimony has fewer tendencies to anionic behaviour than ordinary nonmetals. Its solution chemistry is characterised by the formation of oxyanions. Like arsenic, antimony generally forms compounds in which it has an oxidation state of +3 or +5. The halides, and the oxides and their derivatives are illustrative examples. The +5 state is less stable than the +3, but relatively easier to attain than with arsenic. This is explained by the poor shielding afforded the arsenic nucleus by its 3d10 electrons. In comparison, the tendency of antimony (being a heavier atom) to oxidize more easily partially offsets the effect of its 4d10 shell. Tripositive antimony is amphoteric; pentapositive antimony is (predominately) acidic. Consistent with an increase in metallic character down group 15, antimony forms salts or salt-like compounds including a nitrate Sb(NO3)3, phosphate SbPO4, sulfate Sb2(SO4)3 and perchlorate Sb(ClO4)3. The otherwise acidic pentoxide Sb2O5 shows some basic (metallic) behaviour in that it can be dissolved in very acidic solutions, with the formation of the oxycation SbO. The oxide Sb2O3 is polymeric, amphoteric, and a glass former. Antimony has an extensive organometallic chemistry (see Organoantimony chemistry).

Tellurium

Tellurium is a silvery-white shiny solid. It has a density of 6.24 g/cm3, is brittle, and is the softest of the commonly recognised metalloids, being marginally harder than sulfur. Large pieces of tellurium are stable in air. The finely powdered form is oxidized by air in the presence of moisture. Tellurium reacts with boiling water, or when freshly precipitated even at 50 °C, to give the dioxide and hydrogen: Te + 2 H2O → TeO2 + 2 H2. It reacts (to varying degrees) with nitric, sulfuric, and hydrochloric acids to give compounds such as the sulfoxide TeSO3 or tellurous acid H2TeO3, the basic nitrate (Te2O4H)+(NO3)−, or the oxide sulfate Te2O3(SO4). It dissolves in boiling alkalis, to give the tellurite and telluride: 3 Te + 6 KOH = K2TeO3 + 2 K2Te + 3 H2O, a reaction that proceeds or is reversible with increasing or decreasing temperature.

At higher temperatures tellurium is sufficiently plastic to extrude. It melts at 449.51 °C. Crystalline tellurium has a structure consisting of parallel infinite spiral chains. The bonding between adjacent atoms in a chain is covalent, but there is evidence of a weak metallic interaction between the neighbouring atoms of different chains. Tellurium is a semiconductor with an electrical conductivity of around 1.0 S•cm−1 and a band gap of 0.32 to 0.38 eV. Liquid tellurium is a semiconductor, with an electrical conductivity, on melting, of around 1.9 × 103 S•cm−1. Superheated liquid tellurium is a metallic conductor.

Most of the chemistry of tellurium is characteristic of a nonmetal.
It shows some cationic behaviour. The dioxide dissolves in acid to yield the trihydroxotellurium(IV) Te(OH)3+ ion; the red Te42+ and yellow-orange Te62+ ions form when tellurium is oxidized in fluorosulfuric acid (HSO3F), or liquid sulfur dioxide (SO2), respectively. It can form alloys with aluminium, silver, and tin. Tellurium shows fewer tendencies to anionic behaviour than ordinary nonmetals. Its solution chemistry is characterised by the formation of oxyanions. Tellurium generally forms compounds in which it has an oxidation state of −2, +4 or +6. The +4 state is the most stable. Tellurides of composition XxTey are easily formed with most other elements and represent the most common tellurium minerals. Nonstoichiometry is pervasive, especially with transition metals. Many tellurides can be regarded as metallic alloys. The increase in metallic character evident in tellurium, as compared to the lighter chalcogens, is further reflected in the reported formation of various other oxyacid salts, such as a basic selenate 2TeO2·SeO3  and an analogous perchlorate and periodate 2TeO2·HXO4. Tellurium forms a polymeric, amphoteric, glass-forming oxide TeO2. It is a "conditional" glass-forming oxide – it forms a glass with a very small amount of additive. Tellurium has an extensive organometallic chemistry (see Organotellurium chemistry).

Elements less commonly recognised as metalloids

Carbon

Carbon is ordinarily classified as a nonmetal but has some metallic properties and is occasionally classified as a metalloid. Hexagonal graphitic carbon (graphite) is the most thermodynamically stable allotrope of carbon under ambient conditions. It has a lustrous appearance and is a fairly good electrical conductor. Graphite has a layered structure. Each layer consists of carbon atoms bonded to three other carbon atoms in a hexagonal lattice arrangement. The layers are stacked together and held loosely by van der Waals forces and delocalized valence electrons.

Like a metal, the conductivity of graphite in the direction of its planes decreases as the temperature is raised; it has the electronic band structure of a semimetal. The allotropes of carbon, including graphite, can accept foreign atoms or compounds into their structures via substitution, intercalation, or doping. The resulting materials are referred to as "carbon alloys". Carbon can form ionic salts, including a hydrogen sulfate, perchlorate, and nitrate (CX−.2HX, where X = HSO4, ClO4; and CNO.3HNO3).

Carbon is brittle, and behaves as a semiconductor in a direction perpendicular to its planes. Most of its chemistry is nonmetallic; it has a relatively high ionization energy and, compared to most metals, a relatively high electronegativity. Carbon can form anions such as C4− (methanide), C (acetylide), and C (sesquicarbide or allylenide), in compounds with metals of main groups 1–3, and with the lanthanides and actinides. Its oxide CO2 forms carbonic acid H2CO3.

Aluminium

Aluminium is ordinarily classified as a metal. It is lustrous, malleable and ductile, and has high electrical and thermal conductivity. Like most metals it has a close-packed crystalline structure,  and forms a cation in aqueous solution.

It has some properties that are unusual for a metal; taken together, these are sometimes used as a basis to classify aluminium as a metalloid. Its crystalline structure shows some evidence of directional bonding. Aluminium bonds covalently in most compounds. The oxide Al2O3 is amphoteric and a conditional glass-former. Aluminium can form anionic aluminates, such behaviour being considered nonmetallic in character.

Classifying aluminium as a metalloid has been disputed given its many metallic properties. It is therefore, arguably, an exception to the mnemonic that elements adjacent to the metal–nonmetal dividing line are metalloids.

Stott labels aluminium as a weak metal. It has the physical properties of a metal but some of the chemical properties of a nonmetal. Steele notes the paradoxical chemical behaviour of aluminium: "It resembles a weak metal in its amphoteric oxide and in the covalent character of many of its compounds ... Yet it is a highly electropositive metal ... [with] a high negative electrode potential". Moody says that, "aluminium is on the 'diagonal borderland' between metals and non-metals in the chemical sense."

Selenium

Selenium shows borderline metalloid or nonmetal behaviour.

Its most stable form, the grey trigonal allotrope, is sometimes called "metallic" selenium because its electrical conductivity is several orders of magnitude greater than that of the red monoclinic form. The metallic character of selenium is further shown by its lustre, and its crystalline structure, which is thought to include weakly "metallic" interchain bonding. Selenium can be drawn into thin threads when molten and viscous. It shows reluctance to acquire "the high positive oxidation numbers characteristic of nonmetals". It can form cyclic polycations (such as Se) when dissolved in oleums (an attribute it shares with sulfur and tellurium), and a hydrolysed cationic salt in the form of trihydroxoselenium(IV) perchlorate [Se(OH)3]+·ClO.

The nonmetallic character of selenium is shown by its brittleness and the low electrical conductivity (~10−9 to 10−12 S•cm−1) of its highly purified form. This is comparable to or less than that of bromine (7.95 S•cm−1), a nonmetal. Selenium has the electronic band structure of a semiconductor and retains its semiconducting properties in liquid form. It has a relatively high electronegativity (2.55 revised Pauling scale). Its reaction chemistry is mainly that of its nonmetallic anionic forms Se2−, SeO and SeO.

Selenium is commonly described as a metalloid in the environmental chemistry literature. It moves through the aquatic environment similarly to arsenic and antimony; its water-soluble salts, in higher concentrations, have a similar toxicological profile to that of arsenic.

Polonium

Polonium is "distinctly metallic" in some ways. Both of its allotropic forms are metallic conductors. It is soluble in acids, forming the rose-coloured Po2+ cation and displacing hydrogen: Po + 2 H+ → Po2+ + H2. Many polonium salts are known. The oxide PoO2 is predominantly basic in nature. Polonium is a reluctant oxidizing agent, unlike its lightest congener oxygen: highly reducing conditions are required for the formation of the Po2− anion in aqueous solution.

Whether polonium is ductile or brittle is unclear. It is predicted to be ductile based on its calculated elastic constants. It has a simple cubic crystalline structure. Such a structure has few slip systems and "leads to very low ductility and hence low fracture resistance".

Polonium shows nonmetallic character in its halides, and by the existence of polonides. The halides have properties generally characteristic of nonmetal halides (being volatile, easily hydrolyzed, and soluble in organic solvents). Many metal polonides, obtained by heating the elements together at 500–1,000 °C, and containing the Po2− anion, are also known.

Astatine

As a halogen, astatine tends to be classified as a nonmetal. It has some marked metallic properties and is sometimes instead classified as either a metalloid or (less often) as a metal. Immediately following its production in 1940, early investigators considered it a metal. In 1949 it was called the most noble (difficult to reduce) nonmetal as well as being a relatively noble (difficult to oxidize) metal. In 1950 astatine was described as a halogen and (therefore) a reactive nonmetal. In 2013, on the basis of relativistic modelling, astatine was predicted to be a monatomic metal, with a face-centred cubic crystalline structure.

Several authors have commented on the metallic nature of some of the properties of astatine. Since iodine is a semiconductor in the direction of its planes, and since the halogens become more metallic with increasing atomic number, it has been presumed that astatine would be a metal if it could form a condensed phase. Astatine may be metallic in the liquid state on the basis that elements with an enthalpy of vaporization (∆Hvap) greater than ~42 kJ/mol are metallic when liquid. Such elements include boron, silicon, germanium, antimony, selenium, and tellurium. Estimated values for ∆Hvap of diatomic astatine are 50 kJ/mol or higher; diatomic iodine, with a ∆Hvap of 41.71, falls just short of the threshold figure.

"Like typical metals, it [astatine] is precipitated by hydrogen sulfide even from strongly acid solutions and is displaced in a free form from sulfate solutions; it is deposited on the cathode on electrolysis." Further indications of a tendency for astatine to behave like a (heavy) metal are: "... the formation of pseudohalide compounds ... complexes of astatine cations ... complex anions of trivalent astatine ... as well as complexes with a variety of organic solvents". It has also been argued that astatine demonstrates cationic behaviour, by way of stable At+ and AtO+ forms, in strongly acidic aqueous solutions.

Some of astatine's reported properties are nonmetallic. It has been extrapolated to have the narrow liquid range ordinarily associated with nonmetals (mp 302 °C; bp 337 °C), although experimental indications suggest a lower boiling point of about 230±3 °C. Batsanov gives a calculated band gap energy for astatine of 0.7 eV; this is consistent with nonmetals (in physics) having separated valence and conduction bands and thereby being either semiconductors or insulators. The chemistry of astatine in aqueous solution is mainly characterised by the formation of various anionic species. Most of its known compounds resemble those of iodine, which is a halogen and a nonmetal. Such compounds include astatides (XAt), astatates (XAtO3), and monovalent interhalogen compounds.

Restrepo et al. reported that astatine appeared to be more polonium-like than halogen-like. They did so on the basis of detailed comparative studies of the known and interpolated properties of 72 elements.

Related concepts

Near metalloids

In the periodic table, some of the elements adjacent to the commonly recognised metalloids, although usually classified as either metals or nonmetals, are occasionally referred to as near-metalloids or noted for their metalloidal character. To the left of the metal–nonmetal dividing line, such elements include gallium, tin and bismuth. They show unusual packing structures, marked covalent chemistry (molecular or polymeric), and amphoterism. To the right of the dividing line are carbon, phosphorus, selenium and iodine. They exhibit metallic lustre, semiconducting properties and bonding or valence bands with delocalized character. This applies to their most thermodynamically stable forms under ambient conditions: carbon as graphite; phosphorus as black phosphorus; and selenium as grey selenium.

Allotropes

Different crystalline forms of an element are called allotropes. Some allotropes, particularly those of elements located (in periodic table terms) alongside or near the notional dividing line between metals and nonmetals, exhibit more pronounced metallic, metalloidal or nonmetallic behaviour than others. The existence of such allotropes can complicate the classification of the elements involved.

Tin, for example, has two allotropes: tetragonal "white" β-tin and cubic "grey" α-tin. White tin is a very shiny, ductile and malleable metal. It is the stable form at or above room temperature and has an electrical conductivity of 9.17 × 104 S·cm−1 (~1/6th that of copper). Grey tin usually has the appearance of a grey micro-crystalline powder, and can also be prepared in brittle semi-lustrous crystalline or polycrystalline forms. It is the stable form below 13.2 °C and has an electrical conductivity of between (2–5) × 102 S·cm−1 (~1/250th that of white tin). Grey tin has the same crystalline structure as that of diamond. It behaves as a semiconductor (as if it had a band gap of 0.08 eV), but has the electronic band structure of a semimetal. It has been referred to as either a very poor metal, a metalloid, a nonmetal or a near metalloid.

The diamond allotrope of carbon is clearly nonmetallic, being translucent and having a low electrical conductivity of 10−14 to 10−16 S·cm−1. Graphite has an electrical conductivity of 3 × 104 S·cm−1, a figure more characteristic of a metal. Phosphorus, sulfur, arsenic, selenium, antimony, and bismuth also have less stable allotropes that display different behaviours.

Abundance, extraction, and cost

Abundance
The table gives crustal abundances of the elements commonly to rarely recognised as metalloids. Some other elements are included for comparison: oxygen and xenon (the most and least abundant elements with stable isotopes); iron and the coinage metals copper, silver, and gold; and rhenium, the least abundant stable metal (aluminium is normally the most abundant metal). Various abundance estimates have been published; these often disagree to some extent.

Extraction
The recognised metalloids can be obtained by chemical reduction of either their oxides or their sulfides. Simpler or more complex extraction methods may be employed depending on the starting form and economic factors. Boron is routinely obtained by reducing the trioxide with magnesium: B2O3 + 3 Mg → 2 B + 3MgO; after secondary processing the resulting brown powder has a purity of up to 97%. Boron of higher purity (> 99%) is prepared by heating volatile boron compounds, such as BCl3 or BBr3, either in a hydrogen atmosphere (2 BX3 + 3 H2 → 2 B + 6 HX) or to the point of thermal decomposition. Silicon and germanium are obtained from their oxides by heating the oxide with carbon or hydrogen: SiO2 + C → Si + CO2; GeO2 + 2 H2 → Ge + 2 H2O. Arsenic is isolated from its pyrite (FeAsS) or arsenical pyrite (FeAs2) by heating; alternatively, it can be obtained from its oxide by reduction with carbon: 2 As2O3 + 3 C → 2 As + 3 CO2. Antimony is derived from its sulfide by reduction with iron: Sb2S3 → 2 Sb + 3 FeS. Tellurium is prepared from its oxide by dissolving it in aqueous NaOH, yielding tellurite, then by electrolytic reduction: TeO2 + 2 NaOH → Na2TeO3 + H2O; Na2TeO3 + H2O → Te + 2 NaOH + O2. Another option is reduction of the oxide by roasting with carbon: TeO2 + C → Te + CO2.

Production methods for the elements less frequently recognised as metalloids involve natural processing, electrolytic or chemical reduction, or irradiation. Carbon (as graphite) occurs naturally and is extracted by crushing the parent rock and floating the lighter graphite to the surface. Aluminium is extracted by dissolving its oxide Al2O3 in molten cryolite Na3AlF6 and then by high temperature electrolytic reduction. Selenium is produced by roasting the coinage metal selenides X2Se (X = Cu, Ag, Au) with soda ash to give the selenite: X2Se + O2 + Na2CO3 → Na2SeO3 + 2 X + CO2; the selenide is neutralized by sulfuric acid H2SO4 to give selenous acid H2SeO3; this is reduced by bubbling with SO2 to yield elemental selenium. Polonium and astatine are produced in minute quantities by irradiating bismuth.

Cost
The recognised metalloids and their closer neighbours mostly cost less than silver; only polonium and astatine are more expensive than gold, on account of their significant radioactivity. As of 5 April 2014, prices for small samples (up to 100 g) of silicon, antimony and tellurium, and graphite, aluminium and selenium, average around one third the cost of silver (US$1.5 per gram or about $45 an ounce). Boron, germanium, and arsenic samples average about three-and-a-half times the cost of silver. Polonium is available for about $100 per microgram. Zalutsky and Pruszynski estimate a similar cost for producing astatine. Prices for the applicable elements traded as commodities tend to range from two to three times cheaper than the sample price (Ge), to nearly three thousand times cheaper (As).

Notes

References

Sources

Addison WE 1964, The Allotropy of the Elements, Oldbourne Press, London
Addison CC & Sowerby DB 1972, Main Group Elements: Groups V and VI, Butterworths, London, 
Adler D 1969, 'Half-way Elements: The Technology of Metalloids', book review, Technology Review, vol. 72, no. 1, Oct/Nov, pp. 18–19, 
Ahmed MAK, Fjellvåg H & Kjekshus A 2000, 'Synthesis, Structure and Thermal Stability of Tellurium Oxides and Oxide Sulfate Formed from Reactions in Refluxing Sulfuric Acid', Journal of the Chemical Society, Dalton Transactions, no. 24, pp. 4542–49, 
Ahmeda E & Rucka M 2011, 'Homo- and heteroatomic polycations of groups 15 and 16. Recent advances in synthesis and isolation using room temperature ionic liquids', Coordination Chemistry Reviews, vol. 255, nos 23–24, pp. 2892–903, 
Allen DS & Ordway RJ 1968, Physical Science, 2nd ed., Van Nostrand, Princeton, New Jersey, 
Allen PB & Broughton JQ 1987, 'Electrical Conductivity and Electronic Properties of Liquid Silicon', Journal of Physical Chemistry, vol. 91, no. 19, pp. 4964–70, 
Alloul H 2010, Introduction to the Physics of Electrons in Solids, Springer-Verlag, Berlin, 
Anderson JB, Rapposch MH, Anderson CP & Kostiner E 1980, 'Crystal Structure Refinement of Basic Tellurium Nitrate: A Reformulation as (Te2O4H)+(NO3)−', Monatshefte für Chemie/ Chemical Monthly, vol. 111, no. 4, pp. 789–96, 
Antman KH 2001, 'Introduction: The History of Arsenic Trioxide in Cancer Therapy', The Oncologist, vol. 6, suppl. 2, pp. 1–2, 
Apseloff G 1999, 'Therapeutic Uses of Gallium Nitrate: Past, Present, and Future', American Journal of Therapeutics, vol. 6, no. 6, pp. 327–39, 
Arlman EJ 1939, 'The Complex Compounds P(OH)4.ClO4 and Se(OH)3.ClO4', Recueil des Travaux Chimiques des Pays-Bas, vol. 58, no. 10, pp. 871–74, 
Askeland DR, Phulé PP & Wright JW 2011, The Science and Engineering of Materials, 6th ed., Cengage Learning, Stamford, CT, 
Asmussen J & Reinhard DK 2002, Diamond Films Handbook, Marcel Dekker, New York, 
Atkins P, Overton T, Rourke J, Weller M & Armstrong F 2006, Shriver & Atkins' Inorganic Chemistry, 4th ed., Oxford University Press, Oxford, 
Atkins P, Overton T, Rourke J, Weller M & Armstrong F 2010, Shriver & Atkins' Inorganic Chemistry, 5th ed., Oxford University Press, Oxford, 
Austen K 2012, 'A Factory for Elements that Barely Exist', New Scientist, 21 Apr, p. 12
Ba LA, Döring M, Jamier V & Jacob C 2010, 'Tellurium: an Element with Great Biological Potency and Potential', Organic & Biomolecular Chemistry, vol. 8, pp. 4203–16, 
Bagnall KW 1957, Chemistry of the Rare Radioelements: Polonium-actinium, Butterworths Scientific Publications, London
Bagnall KW 1966, The Chemistry of Selenium, Tellurium and Polonium, Elsevier, Amsterdam
Bagnall KW 1990, 'Compounds of Polonium', in KC Buschbeck & C Keller (eds), Gmelin Handbook of Inorganic and Organometallic Chemistry, 8th ed., Po Polonium, Supplement vol. 1, Springer-Verlag, Berlin, pp. 285–340, 
Bailar JC, Moeller T & Kleinberg J 1965, University Chemistry, DC Heath, Boston
Bailar JC & Trotman-Dickenson AF 1973, Comprehensive Inorganic Chemistry, vol. 4, Pergamon, Oxford
Bailar JC, Moeller T, Kleinberg J, Guss CO, Castellion ME & Metz C 1989, Chemistry, 3rd ed., Harcourt Brace Jovanovich, San Diego, 
Barfuß H, Böhnlein G, Freunek P, Hofmann R, Hohenstein H, Kreische W, Niedrig H and Reimer A 1981, 'The Electric Quadrupole Interaction of 111Cd in Arsenic Metal and in the System Sb1–xInx and Sb1–xCdx', Hyperfine Interactions, vol. 10, nos 1–4, pp. 967–72, 
Barnett EdB & Wilson CL 1959, Inorganic Chemistry: A Text-book for Advanced Students, 2nd ed., Longmans, London
Barrett J 2003, Inorganic Chemistry in Aqueous Solution, The Royal Society of Chemistry, Cambridge, 
Barsanov GP & Ginzburg AI 1974, 'Mineral', in AM Prokhorov (ed.), Great Soviet Encyclopedia, 3rd ed., vol. 16, Macmillan, New York, pp. 329–32
Bassett LG, Bunce SC, Carter AE, Clark HM & Hollinger HB 1966, Principles of Chemistry, Prentice-Hall, Englewood Cliffs, New Jersey
Batsanov SS 1971, 'Quantitative Characteristics of Bond Metallicity in Crystals', Journal of Structural Chemistry, vol. 12, no. 5, pp. 809–13, 
Baudis U & Fichte R 2012, 'Boron and Boron Alloys', in F Ullmann (ed.), Ullmann's Encyclopedia of Industrial Chemistry, vol. 6, Wiley-VCH, Weinheim, pp. 205–17, 
Becker WM, Johnson VA & Nussbaum 1971, 'The Physical Properties of Tellurium', in WC Cooper (ed.), Tellurium, Van Nostrand Reinhold, New York
Belpassi L, Tarantelli F, Sgamellotti A & Quiney HM 2006, 'The Electronic Structure of Alkali Aurides. A Four-Component Dirac−Kohn−Sham study', The Journal of Physical Chemistry A, vol. 110, no. 13, April 6, pp. 4543–54, 
Berger LI 1997, Semiconductor Materials, CRC Press, Boca Raton, Florida, 
Bettelheim F, Brown WH, Campbell MK & Farrell SO 2010, Introduction to General, Organic, and Biochemistry, 9th ed., Brooks/Cole, Belmont CA, 
Bianco E, Butler S, Jiang S, Restrepo OD, Windl W & Goldberger JE 2013, 'Stability and Exfoliation of Germanane: A Germanium Graphane Analogue,' ACS Nano, March 19 (web), 
Bodner GM & Pardue HL 1993, Chemistry, An Experimental Science, John Wiley & Sons, New York, 
Bogoroditskii NP & Pasynkov VV 1967, Radio and Electronic Materials, Iliffe Books, London
Bomgardner MM 2013, 'Thin-Film Solar Firms Revamp To Stay In The Game', Chemical & Engineering News, vol. 91, no. 20, pp. 20–21, 
Bond GC 2005, Metal-Catalysed Reactions of Hydrocarbons, Springer, New York, 
Booth VH & Bloom ML 1972, Physical Science: A Study of Matter and Energy, Macmillan, New York
Borst KE 1982, 'Characteristic Properties of Metallic Crystals', Journal of Educational Modules for Materials Science and Engineering, vol. 4, no. 3, pp. 457–92, 
Boyer RD, Li J, Ogata S & Yip S 2004, 'Analysis of Shear Deformations in Al and Cu: Empirical Potentials Versus Density Functional Theory', Modelling and Simulation in Materials Science and Engineering, vol. 12, no. 5, pp. 1017–29, 
Bradbury GM, McGill MV, Smith HR & Baker PS 1957, Chemistry and You, Lyons and Carnahan, Chicago
Bradley D 2014, Resistance is Low: New Quantum Effect, spectroscopyNOW, viewed 15 December 2014-12-15
Brescia F, Arents J, Meislich H & Turk A 1980, Fundamentals of Chemistry, 4th ed., Academic Press, New York, 
Brown L & Holme T 2006, Chemistry for Engineering Students, Thomson Brooks/Cole, Belmont California, 
Brown WP c. 2007 'The Properties of Semi-Metals or Metalloids,' Doc Brown's Chemistry: Introduction to the Periodic Table, viewed 8 February 2013
Brown TL, LeMay HE, Bursten BE, Murphy CJ, Woodward P 2009, Chemistry: The Central Science, 11th ed., Pearson Education, Upper Saddle River, New Jersey, 
Brownlee RB, Fuller RW, Hancock WJ, Sohon MD & Whitsit JE 1943, Elements of Chemistry, Allyn and Bacon, Boston
Brownlee RB, Fuller RT, Whitsit JE Hancock WJ & Sohon MD 1950, Elements of Chemistry, Allyn and Bacon, Boston
Bucat RB (ed.) 1983, Elements of Chemistry: Earth, Air, Fire & Water, vol. 1, Australian Academy of Science, Canberra, 
Büchel KH (ed.) 1983, Chemistry of Pesticides, John Wiley & Sons, New York, 
Büchel KH, Moretto H-H, Woditsch P 2003, Industrial Inorganic Chemistry, 2nd ed., Wiley-VCH, 
Burkhart CN, Burkhart CG & Morrell DS 2011, 'Treatment of Tinea Versicolor', in HI Maibach & F Gorouhi (eds), Evidence Based Dermatology, 2nd ed., People's Medical Publishing House, Shelton, CT, pp. 365–72, 
Burrows A, Holman J, Parsons A, Pilling G & Price G 2009, Chemistry3: Introducing Inorganic, Organic and Physical Chemistry, Oxford University, Oxford, 
Butterman WC & Carlin JF 2004, Mineral Commodity Profiles: Antimony, US Geological Survey
Butterman WC & Jorgenson JD 2005, Mineral Commodity Profiles: Germanium, US Geological Survey
Calderazzo F, Ercoli R & Natta G 1968, 'Metal Carbonyls: Preparation, Structure, and Properties', in I Wender & P Pino (eds), Organic Syntheses via Metal Carbonyls: Volume 1, Interscience Publishers, New York, pp. 1–272
Carapella SC 1968a, 'Arsenic' in CA Hampel (ed.), The Encyclopedia of the Chemical Elements, Reinhold, New York, pp. 29–32
Carapella SC 1968, 'Antimony' in CA Hampel (ed.), The Encyclopedia of the Chemical Elements, Reinhold, New York, pp. 22–25
Carlin JF 2011, Minerals Year Book: Antimony, United States Geological Survey
Carmalt CJ & Norman NC 1998, 'Arsenic, Antimony and Bismuth: Some General Properties and Aspects of Periodicity', in NC Norman (ed.), Chemistry of Arsenic, Antimony and Bismuth, Blackie Academic & Professional, London, pp. 1–38, 
Carter CB & Norton MG 2013, Ceramic Materials: Science and Engineering, 2nd ed., Springer Science+Business Media, New York, 
Cegielski C 1998, Yearbook of Science and the Future, Encyclopædia Britannica, Chicago, 
Chalmers B 1959, Physical Metallurgy, John Wiley & Sons, New York
Champion J, Alliot C, Renault E, Mokili BM, Chérel M, Galland N & Montavon G 2010, 'Astatine Standard Redox Potentials and Speciation in Acidic Medium', The Journal of Physical Chemistry A, vol. 114, no. 1, pp. 576–82, 
Chang R 2002, Chemistry, 7th ed., McGraw Hill, Boston, 
Chao MS & Stenger VA 1964, 'Some Physical Properties of Highly Purified Bromine', Talanta, vol. 11, no. 2, pp. 271–81, 
Charlier J-C, Gonze X, Michenaud J-P 1994, First-principles Study of the Stacking Effect on the Electronic Properties of Graphite(s), Carbon, vol. 32, no. 2, pp. 289–99, 
Chatt J 1951, 'Metal and Metalloid Compounds of the Alkyl Radicals', in EH Rodd (ed.), Chemistry of Carbon Compounds: A Modern Comprehensive Treatise, vol. 1, part A, Elsevier, Amsterdam, pp. 417–58
Chedd G 1969, Half-Way Elements: The Technology of Metalloids, Doubleday, New York
Chizhikov DM & Shchastlivyi VP 1968, Selenium and Selenides, translated from the Russian by EM Elkin, Collet's, London
Chizhikov DM & Shchastlivyi 1970, Tellurium and the Tellurides, Collet's, London
Choppin GR & Johnsen RH 1972, Introductory Chemistry, Addison-Wesley, Reading, Massachusetts
Chopra IS, Chaudhuri S, Veyan JF & Chabal YJ 2011, 'Turning Aluminium into a Noble-metal-like Catalyst for Low-temperature Activation of Molecular Hydrogen', Nature Materials, vol. 10, pp. 884–89, 
Chung DDL 2010, Composite Materials: Science and Applications, 2nd ed., Springer-Verlag, London, 
Clark GL 1960, The Encyclopedia of Chemistry, Reinhold, New York
Cobb C & Fetterolf ML 2005, The Joy of Chemistry, Prometheus Books, New York, 
Cohen ML & Chelikowsky JR 1988, Electronic Structure and Optical Properties of Semiconductors, Springer Verlag, Berlin, 
Coles BR & Caplin AD 1976, The Electronic Structures of Solids, Edward Arnold, London, 
Conkling JA & Mocella C 2011, Chemistry of Pyrotechnics: Basic Principles and Theory, 2nd ed., CRC Press, Boca Raton, FL, 
Considine DM & Considine GD (eds) 1984, 'Metalloid', in Van Nostrand Reinhold Encyclopedia of Chemistry, 4th ed., Van Nostrand Reinhold, New York, 
Cooper DG 1968, The Periodic Table, 4th ed., Butterworths, London
Corbridge DEC 2013, Phosphorus: Chemistry, Biochemistry and Technology, 6th ed., CRC Press, Boca Raton, Florida, 
Corwin CH 2005, Introductory Chemistry: Concepts & Connections, 4th ed., Prentice Hall, Upper Saddle River, New Jersey, 
Cotton FA, Wilkinson G & Gaus P 1995, Basic Inorganic Chemistry, 3rd ed., John Wiley & Sons, New York, 
Cotton FA, Wilkinson G, Murillo CA & Bochmann 1999, Advanced Inorganic Chemistry, 6th ed., John Wiley & Sons, New York, 
Cox PA 1997, The Elements: Their Origin, Abundance and Distribution, Oxford University, Oxford, 
Cox PA 2004, Inorganic Chemistry, 2nd ed., Instant Notes series, Bios Scientific, London, 
Craig PJ, Eng G & Jenkins RO 2003, 'Occurrence and Pathways of Organometallic Compounds in the Environment – General Considerations' in PJ Craig (ed.), Organometallic Compounds in the Environment, 2nd ed., John Wiley & Sons, Chichester, West Sussex, pp. 1–56, 
Craig PJ & Maher WA 2003, 'Organoselenium compounds in the environment', in Organometallic Compounds in the Environment, PJ Craig (ed.), John Wiley & Sons, New York, pp. 391–98, 
Crow JM 2011, 'Boron Carbide Could Light Way to Less-toxic Green Pyrotechnics', Nature News, 8 April, 
Cusack N 1967, The Electrical and Magnetic Properties of Solids: An Introductory Textbook, 5th ed., John Wiley & Sons, New York
Cusack N E 1987, The Physics of Structurally Disordered Matter: An Introduction, A Hilger in association with the University of Sussex Press, Bristol, 
Daintith J (ed.) 2004, Oxford Dictionary of Chemistry, 5th ed., Oxford University, Oxford, 
Danaith J (ed.) 2008, Oxford Dictionary of Chemistry, Oxford University Press, Oxford, 
 Daniel-Hoffmann M, Sredni B & Nitzan Y 2012, 'Bactericidal Activity of the Organo-Tellurium Compound AS101 Against Enterobacter Cloacae,'''  Journal of Antimicrobial Chemotherapy, vol. 67, no. 9, pp. 2165–72, 
Daub GW & Seese WS 1996, Basic Chemistry, 7th ed., Prentice Hall, New York, 
Davidson DF & Lakin HW 1973, 'Tellurium', in DA Brobst & WP Pratt (eds), United States Mineral Resources, Geological survey professional paper 820, United States Government Printing Office, Washington, pp. 627–30
Dávila ME, Molotov SL, Laubschat C & Asensio MC 2002, 'Structural Determination of Yb Single-Crystal Films Grown on W(110) Using Photoelectron Diffraction', Physical Review B, vol. 66, no. 3, p. 035411–18, 
Demetriou MD, Launey ME, Garrett G, Schramm JP, Hofmann DC, Johnson WL &  Ritchie RO 2011, 'A Damage-Tolerant Glass', Nature Materials, vol. 10, February, pp. 123–28, 
Deming HG 1925, General Chemistry: An Elementary Survey, 2nd ed., John Wiley & Sons, New York
Denniston KJ, Topping JJ & Caret RL 2004, General, Organic, and Biochemistry, 5th ed., McGraw-Hill, New York, 
Deprez N & McLachan DS 1988, 'The Analysis of the Electrical Conductivity of Graphite Conductivity of Graphite Powders During Compaction', Journal of Physics D: Applied Physics, vol. 21, no. 1, 
Desai PD, James HM & Ho CY 1984, 'Electrical Resistivity of Aluminum and Manganese', Journal of Physical and Chemical Reference Data, vol. 13, no. 4, pp. 1131–72, 
Desch CH 1914, Intermetallic Compounds, Longmans, Green and Co., New York
Detty MR & O'Regan MB 1994, Tellurium-Containing Heterocycles, (The Chemistry of Heterocyclic Compounds, vol. 53), John Wiley & Sons, New York
Dev N 2008, 'Modelling Selenium Fate and Transport in Great Salt Lake Wetlands', PhD dissertation, University of Utah, ProQuest, Ann Arbor, Michigan, 
De Zuane J 1997, Handbook of Drinking Water Quality, 2nd ed., John Wiley & Sons, New York, 
Di Pietro P 2014, Optical Properties of Bismuth-Based Topological Insulators, Springer International Publishing, Cham, Switzerland, 
Divakar C, Mohan M & Singh AK 1984, 'The Kinetics of Pressure-Induced Fcc-Bcc Transformation in Ytterbium', Journal of Applied Physics, vol. 56, no. 8, pp. 2337–40, 
Donohue J 1982, The Structures of the Elements, Robert E. Krieger, Malabar, Florida, 
Douglade J & Mercier R 1982, 'Structure Cristalline et Covalence des Liaisons dans le Sulfate d'Arsenic(III), As2(SO4)3', Acta Crystallographica Section B, vol. 38, no. 3, pp. 720–23, 
Du Y, Ouyang C, Shi S & Lei M 2010, 'Ab Initio Studies on Atomic and Electronic Structures of Black Phosphorus', Journal of Applied Physics, vol. 107, no. 9, pp. 093718–1–4, 
Dunlap BD, Brodsky MB, Shenoy GK & Kalvius GM 1970, 'Hyperfine Interactions and Anisotropic Lattice Vibrations of 237Np in α-Np Metal', Physical Review B, vol. 1, no. 1, pp. 44–49, 
Dunstan S 1968, Principles of Chemistry, D. Van Nostrand Company, London
Dupree R, Kirby DJ & Freyland W 1982, 'N.M.R. Study of Changes in Bonding and the Metal-Non-metal Transition in Liquid Caesium-Antimony Alloys', Philosophical Magazine Part B, vol. 46 no. 6, pp. 595–606, 
Eagleson M 1994, Concise Encyclopedia Chemistry, Walter de Gruyter, Berlin, 
Eason R 2007, Pulsed Laser Deposition of Thin Films: Applications-Led Growth of Functional Materials, Wiley-Interscience, New York
Ebbing DD & Gammon SD 2010, General Chemistry, 9th ed. enhanced, Brooks/Cole, Belmont, California, 
Eberle SH 1985, 'Chemical Behavior and Compounds of Astatine', pp. 183–209, in Kugler & Keller
Edwards PP & Sienko MJ 1983, 'On the Occurrence of Metallic Character in the Periodic Table of the Elements', Journal of Chemical Education, vol. 60, no. 9, pp. 691–96, 
Edwards PP 1999, 'Chemically Engineering the Metallic, Insulating and Superconducting State of Matter' in KR Seddon & M Zaworotko (eds), Crystal Engineering: The Design and Application of Functional Solids, Kluwer Academic, Dordrecht, pp. 409–31, 
Edwards PP 2000, 'What, Why and When is a metal?', in N Hall (ed.), The New Chemistry, Cambridge University, Cambridge, pp. 85–114, 
Edwards PP, Lodge MTJ, Hensel F & Redmer R 2010, '... A Metal Conducts and a Non-metal Doesn't', Philosophical Transactions of the Royal Society A: Mathematical, Physical and Engineering Sciences, vol. 368, pp. 941–65, 
Eggins BR 1972, Chemical Structure and Reactivity, MacMillan, London, 
Eichler R, Aksenov NV, Belozerov AV, Bozhikov GA, Chepigin VI, Dmitriev SN, Dressler R, Gäggeler HW, Gorshkov VA, Haenssler F, Itkis MG, Laube A, Lebedev VY, Malyshev ON, Oganessian YT, Petrushkin OV, Piguet D, Rasmussen P,  Shishkin SV, Shutov, AV, Svirikhin AI, Tereshatov EE, Vostokin GK, Wegrzecki M & Yeremin AV 2007, 'Chemical Characterization of Element 112,' Nature, vol. 447, pp. 72–75, 
Ellern H 1968, Military and Civilian Pyrotechnics, Chemical Publishing Company, New York
Emeléus HJ & Sharpe AG 1959, Advances in Inorganic Chemistry and Radiochemistry, vol. 1, Academic Press, New York
Emsley J 1971, The Inorganic Chemistry of the Non-metals, Methuen Educational, London, 
Emsley J 2001, Nature's Building Blocks: An A–Z guide to the Elements, Oxford University Press, Oxford, 
Eranna G 2011, Metal Oxide Nanostructures as Gas Sensing Devices, Taylor & Francis, Boca Raton, Florida, 
Evans KA 1993, 'Properties and Uses of Oxides and Hydroxides,' in AJ Downs (ed.), Chemistry of Aluminium, Gallium, Indium, and Thallium, Blackie Academic & Professional, Bishopbriggs, Glasgow, pp. 248–91, 
Evans RC 1966, An Introduction to Crystal Chemistry, Cambridge University, Cambridge
Everest DA 1953, 'The Chemistry of Bivalent Germanium Compounds. Part IV. Formation of Germanous Salts by Reduction with Hydrophosphorous Acid.' Journal of the Chemical Society, pp. 4117–20, 
EVM (Expert Group on Vitamins and Minerals) 2003, Safe Upper Levels for Vitamins and Minerals, UK Food Standards Agency, London, 
Farandos NM, Yetisen AK, Monteiro MJ, Lowe CR & Yun SH 2014, 'Contact Lens Sensors in Ocular Diagnostics', Advanced Healthcare Materials, viewed 23 November 2014
Fehlner TP 1992, 'Introduction', in TP Fehlner (ed.), Inorganometallic chemistry, Plenum, New York, pp. 1–6, 
Fehlner TP 1990, 'The Metallic Face of Boron,' in AG Sykes (ed.), Advances in Inorganic Chemistry, vol. 35, Academic Press, Orlando, pp. 199–233
Feng & Jin 2005, Introduction to Condensed Matter Physics: Volume 1, World Scientific, Singapore, 
Fernelius WC 1982, 'Polonium', Journal of Chemical Education, vol. 59, no. 9, pp. 741–42, 
Ferro R & Saccone A 2008, Intermetallic Chemistry, Elsevier, Oxford, p. 233, 
Fesquet AA 1872, A Practical Guide for the Manufacture of Metallic Alloys, trans. A. Guettier, Henry Carey Baird, Philadelphia
Fine LW & Beall H 1990, Chemistry for Engineers and Scientists, Saunders College Publishing, Philadelphia, 
Fokwa BPT 2014, 'Borides: Solid-state Chemistry', in Encyclopedia of Inorganic and Bioinorganic Chemistry, John Wiley and Sons, 
Foster W 1936, The Romance of Chemistry, D Appleton-Century, New York
Foster LS & Wrigley AN 1958, 'Periodic Table', in GL Clark, GG Hawley & WA Hamor (eds), The Encyclopedia of Chemistry (Supplement), Reinhold, New York, pp. 215–20
Friend JN 1953, Man and the Chemical Elements, 1st ed., Charles Scribner's Sons, New York
Fritz JS & Gjerde DT 2008, Ion Chromatography, John Wiley & Sons, New York, 
Gary S 2013,  'Poisoned Alloy' the Metal of the Future', News in science, viewed 28 August 2013
Geckeler S 1987, Optical Fiber Transmission Systems, Artech Hous, Norwood, Massachusetts, 
German Energy Society 2008, Planning and Installing Photovoltaic Systems: A Guide for Installers, Architects and Engineers, 2nd ed., Earthscan, London, 
Gordh G, Gordh G & Headrick D 2003, A Dictionary of Entomology, CABI Publishing, Wallingford, 
Gillespie RJ 1998, 'Covalent and Ionic Molecules: Why are BeF2 and AlF3 High Melting Point Solids Whereas BF3 and SiF4 are Gases?', Journal of Chemical Education, vol. 75, no. 7, pp. 923–25, 
Gillespie RJ & Robinson EA 1963, 'The Sulphuric Acid Solvent System. Part IV. Sulphato Compounds of Arsenic (III)', Canadian Journal of Chemistry, vol. 41, no. 2, pp. 450–58
Gillespie RJ & Passmore J 1972, 'Polyatomic Cations', Chemistry in Britain, vol. 8, pp. 475–79
Gladyshev VP & Kovaleva SV 1998, 'Liquidus Shape of the Mercury–Gallium System', Russian Journal of Inorganic Chemistry, vol. 43, no. 9, pp. 1445–46
Glazov VM, Chizhevskaya SN & Glagoleva NN 1969, Liquid Semiconductors, Plenum, New York
Glinka N 1965, General Chemistry, trans. D Sobolev, Gordon & Breach, New York
Glockling F 1969, The Chemistry of Germanium, Academic, London
Glorieux B, Saboungi ML & Enderby JE 2001, 'Electronic Conduction in Liquid Boron', Europhysics Letters (EPL), vol. 56, no. 1, pp. 81–85, 
Goldsmith RH 1982, 'Metalloids', Journal of Chemical Education, vol. 59, no. 6, pp. 526–27, 
Good JM, Gregory O & Bosworth N 1813, 'Arsenicum', in Pantologia: A New Cyclopedia ... of Essays, Treatises, and Systems ... with a General Dictionary of Arts, Sciences, and Words ... , Kearsely, London
Goodrich BG 1844, A Glance at the Physical Sciences, Bradbury, Soden & Co., Boston
Gray T 2009, The Elements: A Visual Exploration of Every Known Atom in the Universe, Black Dog & Leventhal, New York, 
Gray T 2010, 'Metalloids (7)', viewed 8 February 2013
Gray T, Whitby M & Mann N 2011, Mohs Hardness of the Elements, viewed 12 Feb 2012
Greaves GN, Knights JC & Davis EA 1974, 'Electronic Properties of Amorphous Arsenic', in J Stuke & W Brenig (eds), Amorphous and Liquid Semiconductors: Proceedings, vol. 1, Taylor & Francis, London, pp. 369–74, 
Greenwood NN 2001, 'Main Group Element Chemistry at the Millennium', Journal of the Chemical Society, Dalton Transactions, issue 14, pp. 2055–66, 
Greenwood NN & Earnshaw A 2002, Chemistry of the Elements, 2nd ed., Butterworth-Heinemann, 
Guan PF, Fujita T, Hirata A, Liu YH & Chen MW 2012, 'Structural Origins of the Excellent Glass-forming Ability of Pd40Ni40P20', Physical Review Letters, vol. 108, no. 17, pp. 175501–1–5, 
Gunn G (ed.) 2014, Critical Metals Handbook,John Wiley & Sons, Chichester, West Sussex, 
Gupta VB, Mukherjee AK & Cameotra SS 1997, 'Poly(ethylene Terephthalate) Fibres', in MN Gupta & VK Kothari (eds), Manufactured Fibre Technology, Springer Science+Business Media, Dordrecht, pp. 271–317, 
Haaland A, Helgaker TU, Ruud K & Shorokhov DJ 2000, 'Should Gaseous BF3 and SiF4 be Described as Ionic Compounds?', Journal of Chemical Education, vol. 77, no.8, pp. 1076–80, 
Hager T 2006, The Demon under the Microscope, Three Rivers Press, New York, 
Hai H, Jun H, Yong-Mei L, He-Yong H, Yong C &  Kang-Nian F 2012, 'Graphite Oxide as an Efficient and Durable Metal-free Catalyst for Aerobic Oxidative Coupling of Amines to Imines', Green Chemistry, vol. 14, pp. 930–34, 
Haiduc I & Zuckerman JJ 1985, Basic Organometallic Chemistry, Walter de Gruyter, Berlin, 
Haissinsky M & Coche A 1949, 'New Experiments on the Cathodic Deposition of Radio-elements', Journal of the Chemical Society, pp. S397–400
Manson SS & Halford GR 2006, Fatigue and Durability of Structural Materials, ASM International, Materials Park, OH, 
Haller EE 2006, 'Germanium: From its Discovery to SiGe Devices', Materials Science in Semiconductor Processing, vol. 9, nos 4–5, viewed 8 February 2013
Hamm DI 1969, Fundamental Concepts of Chemistry, Meredith Corporation, New York, 
Hampel CA & Hawley GG 1966, The Encyclopedia of Chemistry, 3rd ed., Van Nostrand Reinhold, New York
Hampel CA (ed.) 1968, The Encyclopedia of the Chemical Elements, Reinhold, New York
Hampel CA & Hawley GG 1976, Glossary of Chemical Terms, Van Nostrand Reinhold, New York, 
Harding C, Johnson DA & Janes R 2002, Elements of the p Block, Royal Society of Chemistry, Cambridge, 
Hasan H 2009, The Boron Elements: Boron, Aluminum, Gallium, Indium, Thallium, The Rosen Publishing Group, New York, 
Hatcher WH 1949, An Introduction to Chemical Science, John Wiley & Sons, New York
Hawkes SJ 1999, 'Polonium and Astatine are not Semimetals', Chem 13 News, February, p. 14, 
Hawkes SJ 2001, 'Semimetallicity', Journal of Chemical Education, vol. 78, no. 12, pp. 1686–87, 
Hawkes SJ 2010, 'Polonium and Astatine are not Semimetals', Journal of Chemical Education, vol. 87, no. 8, p. 783, 
Haynes WM (ed.) 2012, CRC Handbook of Chemistry and Physics, 93rd ed., CRC Press, Boca Raton, Florida, 
He M, Kravchyk K, Walter M & Kovalenko MV 2014, 'Monodisperse Antimony Nanocrystals for High-Rate Li-ion and Na-ion Battery Anodes: Nano versus Bulk', Nano Letters, vol. 14, no. 3, pp. 1255–62, 
Henderson M 2000, Main Group Chemistry, The Royal Society of Chemistry, Cambridge, 
Hermann A, Hoffmann R & Ashcroft NW 2013, 'Condensed Astatine: Monatomic and Metallic', Physical Review Letters, vol. 111, pp. 11604–1−11604-5, 
Hérold A 2006, 'An Arrangement of the Chemical Elements in Several Classes Inside the Periodic Table According to their Common Properties', Comptes Rendus Chimie, vol. 9, no. 1, pp. 148–53, 
Herzfeld K 1927, 'On Atomic Properties Which Make an Element a Metal', Physical Review, vol. 29, no. 5, pp. 701–05, 
Hill G & Holman J 2000, Chemistry in Context, 5th ed., Nelson Thornes, Cheltenham, 
Hiller LA & Herber RH 1960, Principles of Chemistry, McGraw-Hill, New York
Hindman JC 1968, 'Neptunium', in CA Hampel (ed.), The Encyclopedia of the Chemical Elements, Reinhold, New York, pp. 432–37
Hoddeson L 2007, 'In the Wake of Thomas Kuhn's Theory of Scientific Revolutions: The Perspective of an Historian of Science,' in S Vosniadou, A Baltas & X Vamvakoussi (eds), Reframing the Conceptual Change Approach in Learning and Instruction, Elsevier, Amsterdam, pp. 25–34, 
Holderness A & Berry M 1979, Advanced Level Inorganic Chemistry, 3rd ed., Heinemann Educational Books, London, 
Holt, Rinehart & Wilson c. 2007 'Why Polonium and Astatine are not Metalloids in HRW texts', viewed 8 February 2013
Hopkins BS & Bailar JC 1956, General Chemistry for Colleges, 5th ed., D. C. Heath, Boston
Horvath 1973, 'Critical Temperature of Elements and the Periodic System', Journal of Chemical Education, vol. 50, no. 5, pp. 335–36, 
Hosseini P, Wright CD & Bhaskaran H 2014, 'An optoelectronic framework enabled by low-dimensional phase-change films,' Nature, vol. 511, pp. 206–11, 
Houghton RP 1979, Metal Complexes in Organic Chemistry, Cambridge University Press, Cambridge, 
House JE 2008, Inorganic Chemistry, Academic Press (Elsevier), Burlington, Massachusetts, 
House JE & House KA 2010, Descriptive Inorganic Chemistry, 2nd ed., Academic Press, Burlington, Massachusetts, 
Housecroft CE & Sharpe AG 2008, Inorganic Chemistry, 3rd ed., Pearson Education, Harlow, 
Hultgren HH 1966, 'Metalloids', in GL Clark & GG Hawley (eds), The Encyclopedia of Inorganic Chemistry, 2nd ed., Reinhold Publishing, New York
Hunt A 2000, The Complete A-Z Chemistry Handbook, 2nd ed., Hodder & Stoughton, London, 
Inagaki M 2000, New Carbons: Control of Structure and Functions, Elsevier, Oxford, 
IUPAC 1959, Nomenclature of Inorganic Chemistry, 1st ed., Butterworths, London
IUPAC 1971, Nomenclature of Inorganic Chemistry, 2nd ed., Butterworths, London, 
IUPAC 2005, Nomenclature of Inorganic Chemistry (the "Red Book"), NG Connelly & T Damhus eds, RSC Publishing, Cambridge, 
IUPAC 2006–, Compendium of Chemical Terminology (the "Gold Book"), 2nd ed., by M Nic, J Jirat & B Kosata, with updates compiled by A Jenkins, 
James M, Stokes R, Ng W & Moloney J 2000, Chemical Connections 2: VCE Chemistry Units 3 & 4, John Wiley & Sons, Milton, Queensland, 
Jaouen G & Gibaud S 2010, 'Arsenic-based Drugs: From Fowler's solution to Modern Anticancer Chemotherapy', Medicinal Organometallic Chemistry, vol. 32, pp. 1–20, 
Jaskula BW 2013, Mineral Commodity Profiles: Gallium, US Geological Survey
Jenkins GM & Kawamura K 1976, Polymeric Carbons – Carbon Fibre, Glass and Char, Cambridge University Press, Cambridge, 
Jezequel G & Thomas J 1997, 'Experimental Band Structure of Semimetal Bismuth', Physical Review B, vol. 56, no. 11, pp. 6620–26, 
Johansen G & Mackintosh AR 1970, 'Electronic Structure and Phase Transitions in Ytterbium', Solid State Communications, vol. 8, no. 2, pp. 121–24
Jolly WL & Latimer WM 1951, 'The Heat of Oxidation of Germanous Iodide and the Germanium Oxidation Potentials', University of California Radiation Laboratory, Berkeley
Jolly WL 1966, The Chemistry of the Non-metals, Prentice-Hall, Englewood Cliffs, New Jersey
Jones BW 2010, Pluto: Sentinel of the Outer Solar System, Cambridge University, Cambridge, 
Kaminow IP & Li T 2002 (eds), Optical Fiber Telecommunications, Volume IVA, Academic Press, San Diego, 
Karabulut M, Melnik E, Stefan R, Marasinghe GK, Ray CS, Kurkjian CR & Day DE 2001, 'Mechanical and Structural Properties of Phosphate Glasses', Journal of Non-Crystalline Solids, vol. 288, nos. 1–3, pp. 8–17, 
Kauthale SS, Tekali SU, Rode AB, Shinde SV, Ameta KL & Pawar RP 2015, 'Silica Sulfuric Acid: A Simple and Powerful Heterogenous Catalyst in Organic Synthesis', in KL Ameta & A Penoni, Heterogeneous Catalysis: A Versatile Tool for the Synthesis of Bioactive Heterocycles, CRC Press, Boca Raton, Florida,  pp. 133–62, 
Kaye GWC & Laby TH 1973, Tables of Physical and Chemical Constants, 14th ed., Longman, London, 
Keall JHH, Martin NH & Tunbridge RE 1946, 'A Report of Three Cases of Accidental Poisoning by Sodium Tellurite', British Journal of Industrial Medicine, vol. 3, no. 3, pp. 175–76
Keevil D 1989, 'Aluminium', in MN Patten (ed.), Information Sources in Metallic Materials, Bowker–Saur, London, pp. 103–19, 
Keller C 1985, 'Preface', in Kugler & Keller
Kelter P, Mosher M & Scott A 2009, Chemistry: the Practical Science, Houghton Mifflin, Boston, 
Kennedy T, Mullane E, Geaney H, Osiak M, O'Dwyer C & Ryan KM 2014, 'High-Performance Germanium Nanowire-Based Lithium-Ion Battery Anodes Extending over 1000 Cycles Through in Situ Formation of a Continuous Porous Network', Nano-letters, vol. 14, no. 2, pp. 716–23, 
Kent W 1950, Kent's Mechanical Engineers' Handbook, 12th ed., vol. 1, John Wiley & Sons, New York
King EL 1979, Chemistry, Painter Hopkins, Sausalito, California, 
King RB 1994, 'Antimony: Inorganic Chemistry', in RB King (ed), Encyclopedia of Inorganic Chemistry, John Wiley, Chichester, pp. 170–75, 
King RB 2004, 'The Metallurgist's Periodic Table and the Zintl-Klemm Concept', in DH Rouvray & RB King (eds), The Periodic Table: Into the 21st Century, Research Studies Press, Baldock, Hertfordshire, pp. 191–206, 
Kinjo R, Donnadieu B, Celik MA, Frenking G & Bertrand G 2011, 'Synthesis and Characterization of a Neutral Tricoordinate Organoboron Isoelectronic with Amines', Science, pp. 610–13, 
Kitaĭgorodskiĭ AI 1961, Organic Chemical Crystallography, Consultants Bureau, New York
Kleinberg J, Argersinger WJ & Griswold E 1960, Inorganic Chemistry, DC Health, Boston
Klement W, Willens RH & Duwez P 1960, 'Non-Crystalline Structure in Solidified Gold–Silicon Alloys', Nature, vol. 187, pp. 869–70, 
Klemm W 1950, 'Einige Probleme aus der Physik und der Chemie der Halbmetalle und der Metametalle', Angewandte Chemie, vol. 62, no. 6, pp. 133–42
Klug HP & Brasted RC 1958, Comprehensive Inorganic Chemistry: The Elements and Compounds of Group IV A, Van Nostrand, New York
Kneen WR, Rogers MJW & Simpson P 1972, Chemistry: Facts, Patterns, and Principles, Addison-Wesley, London, 
Kohl AL & Nielsen R 1997, Gas Purification, 5th ed., Gulf Valley Publishing, Houston, Texas, 
Kolobov AV & Tominaga J 2012, Chalcogenides: Metastability and Phase Change Phenomena, Springer-Verlag, Heidelberg, 
Kolthoff IM & Elving PJ 1978, Treatise on Analytical Chemistry. Analytical Chemistry of Inorganic and Organic Compounds: Antimony, Arsenic, Boron, Carbon, Molybenum, Tungsten, Wiley Interscience, New York, 
Kondrat'ev SN & Mel'nikova SI 1978, 'Preparation and Various Characteristics of Boron Hydrogen Sulfates', Russian Journal of Inorganic Chemistry, vol. 23, no. 6, pp. 805–07
Kopp JG, Lipták BG & Eren H 000, 'Magnetic Flowmeters', in BG Lipták (ed.), Instrument Engineers' Handbook, 4th ed., vol. 1, Process Measurement and Analysis, CRC Press, Boca Raton, Florida, pp. 208–24, 
Korenman IM 1959, 'Regularities in Properties of Thallium', Journal of General Chemistry of the USSR, English translation, Consultants Bureau, New York, vol. 29, no. 2, pp. 1366–90, 
Kosanke KL, Kosanke BJ & Dujay RC 2002, 'Pyrotechnic Particle Morphologies—Metal Fuels', in Selected Pyrotechnic Publications of K.L. and B.J. Kosanke Part 5 (1998 through 2000), Journal of Pyrotechnics, Whitewater, CO, 
Kotz JC, Treichel P & Weaver GC 2009, Chemistry and Chemical Reactivity, 7th ed., Brooks/Cole, Belmont, California, 
Kozyrev PT 1959, 'Deoxidized Selenium and the Dependence of its Electrical Conductivity on Pressure. II', Physics of the Solid State, translation of the journal Solid State Physics (Fizika tverdogo tela) of the Academy of Sciences of the USSR, vol. 1, pp. 102–10
Kraig RE, Roundy D & Cohen ML 2004, 'A Study of the Mechanical and Structural Properties of Polonium', Solid State Communications, vol. 129, issue 6, Feb, pp. 411–13, 
Krannich LK & Watkins CL 2006, 'Arsenic: Organoarsenic chemistry,' Encyclopedia of inorganic chemistry, viewed 12 Feb 2012 
Kreith F & Goswami DY (eds) 2005, The CRC Handbook of Mechanical Engineering, 2nd ed., Boca Raton, Florida, 
Krishnan S, Ansell S, Felten J, Volin K & Price D 1998, 'Structure of Liquid Boron', Physical Review Letters, vol. 81, no. 3, pp. 586–89, 
Kross B 2011, 'What's the melting point of steel?', Questions and Answers, Thomas Jefferson National Accelerator Facility, Newport News, VA
Kudryavtsev AA 1974, The Chemistry & Technology of Selenium and Tellurium, translated from the 2nd Russian edition and revised by EM Elkin, Collet's, London, 
Kugler HK & Keller C (eds) 1985, Gmelin Handbook of Inorganic and Organometallic chemistry, 8th ed., 'At, Astatine', system no. 8a, Springer-Verlag, Berlin, 
Ladd M 1999, Crystal Structures: Lattices and Solids in Stereoview, Horwood Publishing, Chichester, 
Le Bras M, Wilkie CA & Bourbigot S (eds) 2005, Fire Retardancy of Polymers: New Applications of Mineral Fillers, Royal Society of Chemistry, Cambridge, 
Lee J, Lee EK, Joo W, Jang Y, Kim B, Lim JY, Choi S, Ahn SJ, Ahn JR, Park M, Yang C, Choi BL, Hwang S & Whang D 2014, 'Wafer-Scale Growth of Single-Crystal Monolayer Graphene on Reusable Hydrogen-Terminated Germanium', Science, vol. 344, no. 6181, pp. 286–89, 
Legit D, Friák M & Šob M 2010, 'Phase Stability, Elasticity, and Theoretical Strength of Polonium from First Principles,' Physical Review B, vol. 81, pp. 214118–1–19, 
Lehto Y & Hou X 2011, Chemistry and Analysis of Radionuclides: Laboratory Techniques and Methodology, Wiley-VCH, Weinheim, 
Lewis RJ 1993, Hawley's Condensed Chemical Dictionary, 12th ed., Van Nostrand Reinhold, New York, 
Li XP 1990, 'Properties of Liquid Arsenic: A Theoretical Study', Physical Review B, vol. 41, no. 12, pp. 8392–406, 
Lide DR (ed.) 2005, 'Section 14, Geophysics, Astronomy, and Acoustics; Abundance of Elements in the Earth's Crust and in the Sea', in CRC Handbook of Chemistry and Physics, 85th ed., CRC Press, Boca Raton, FL, pp. 14–17, 
Lidin RA 1996, Inorganic Substances Handbook, Begell House, New York, 
Lindsjö M, Fischer A & Kloo L 2004, 'Sb8(GaCl4)2: Isolation of a Homopolyatomic Antimony Cation', Angewandte Chemie, vol. 116, no. 19, pp. 2594–97, 
Lipscomb CA 1972 Pyrotechnics in the '70's A Materials Approach, Naval Ammunition Depot, Research and Development Department, Crane, IN
Lister MW 1965, Oxyacids, Oldbourne Press, London
Liu ZK, Jiang J, Zhou B, Wang ZJ, Zhang Y, Weng HM, Prabhakaran D, Mo S-K, Peng H, Dudin P, Kim T, Hoesch M, Fang Z, Dai X, Shen ZX, Feng DL, Hussain Z & Chen YL 2014, 'A Stable Three-dimensional Topological Dirac Semimetal Cd3As2', Nature Materials, vol. 13, pp. 677–81, 
Locke EG, Baechler RH, Beglinger E, Bruce HD, Drow JT, Johnson KG, Laughnan DG, Paul BH, Rietz RC, Saeman JF & Tarkow H 1956, 'Wood', in RE Kirk & DF Othmer (eds), Encyclopedia of Chemical Technology, vol. 15, The Interscience Encyclopedia, New York, pp. 72–102
Löffler JF, Kündig AA & Dalla Torre FH 2007, 'Rapid Solidification and Bulk Metallic Glasses—Processing and Properties,' in JR Groza, JF Shackelford, EJ Lavernia EJ & MT Powers (eds), Materials Processing Handbook, CRC Press, Boca Raton, Florida, pp. 17–1–44, 
Long GG & Hentz FC 1986, Problem Exercises for General Chemistry, 3rd ed., John Wiley & Sons, New York, 
Lovett DR 1977, Semimetals & Narrow-Bandgap Semi-conductors, Pion, London, 
Lutz J, Schlangenotto H, Scheuermann U, De Doncker R 2011, Semiconductor Power Devices: Physics, Characteristics, Reliability, Springer-Verlag, Berlin, 
Masters GM & Ela W 2008, Introduction to Environmental Engineering and Science, 3rd ed., Prentice Hall, Upper Saddle River, New Jersey, 
MacKay KM, MacKay RA & Henderson W 2002, Introduction to Modern Inorganic Chemistry, 6th ed., Nelson Thornes, Cheltenham, 
MacKenzie D, 2015 'Gas! Gas! Gas!', New Scientist, vol. 228, no. 3044, pp. 34–37
Madelung O 2004, Semiconductors: Data Handbook, 3rd ed., Springer-Verlag, Berlin, 
Maeder T 2013, 'Review of Bi2O3 Based Glasses for Electronics and Related Applications, International Materials Reviews, vol. 58, no. 1, pp. 3‒40, 
Mahan BH 1965, University Chemistry, Addison-Wesley, Reading, Massachusetts
Mainiero C,2014, 'Picatinny chemist wins Young Scientist Award for work on smoke grenades', U.S. Army, Picatinny Public Affairs, 2 April, viewed 9 June 2017
Manahan SE 2001, Fundamentals of Environmental Chemistry, 2nd ed., CRC Press, Boca Raton, Florida, 
Mann JB, Meek TL & Allen LC 2000, 'Configuration Energies of the Main Group Elements', Journal of the American Chemical Society, vol. 122, no. 12, pp. 2780–83, 
Marezio M & Licci F 2000, 'Strategies for Tailoring New Superconducting Systems', in X Obradors, F Sandiumenge & J Fontcuberta (eds), Applied Superconductivity 1999: Large scale applications, volume 1 of Applied Superconductivity 1999: Proceedings of EUCAS 1999, the Fourth European Conference on Applied Superconductivity, held in Sitges, Spain, 14–17 September 1999, Institute of Physics, Bristol, pp. 11–16, 
Marković N, Christiansen C & Goldman AM 1998, 'Thickness-Magnetic Field Phase Diagram at the Superconductor-Insulator Transition in 2D', Physical Review Letters, vol. 81, no. 23, pp. 5217–20, 
Massey AG 2000, Main Group Chemistry, 2nd ed., John Wiley & Sons, Chichester, 
Masterton WL & Slowinski EJ 1977, Chemical Principles, 4th ed., W. B. Saunders, Philadelphia, 
Matula RA 1979, 'Electrical Resistivity of Copper, Gold, Palladium, and Silver,' Journal of Physical and Chemical Reference Data, vol. 8, no. 4, pp. 1147–298, 
McKee DW 1984, 'Tellurium – An Unusual Carbon Oxidation Catalyst', Carbon, vol. 22, no. 6, pp. 513–16
McMurray J & Fay RC 2009, General Chemistry: Atoms First, Prentice Hall, Upper Saddle River, New Jersey, 
McQuarrie DA & Rock PA 1987, General Chemistry, 3rd ed., WH Freeman, New York, 
Mellor JW 1964, A Comprehensive Treatise on Inorganic and Theoretical Chemistry, vol. 9, John Wiley, New York
Mellor JW 1964a, A Comprehensive Treatise on Inorganic and Theoretical Chemistry, vol. 11, John Wiley, New York
Mendeléeff DI 1897, The Principles of Chemistry, vol. 2, 5th ed., trans. G Kamensky, AJ Greenaway (ed.), Longmans, Green & Co., London
Meskers CEM, Hagelüken C & Van Damme G 2009, 'Green Recycling of EEE: Special and Precious Metal EEE', in SM Howard, P Anyalebechi & L Zhang (eds), Proceedings of Sessions and Symposia Sponsored by the Extraction and Processing Division (EPD) of The Minerals, Metals and Materials Society (TMS), held during the TMS 2009 Annual Meeting & Exhibition San Francisco, California, February 15–19, 2009, The Minerals, Metals and Materials Society, Warrendale, Pennsylvania, pp. 1131–36
Metcalfe HC, Williams JE & Castka JF 1974, Modern Chemistry, Holt, Rinehart and Winston, New York, 
Meyer JS, Adams WJ, Brix KV, Luoma SM, Mount DR, Stubblefield WA & Wood CM (eds) 2005, Toxicity of Dietborne Metals to Aquatic Organisms, Proceedings from the Pellston Workshop on Toxicity of Dietborne Metals to Aquatic Organisms, 27 July–1 August 2002, Fairmont Hot Springs, British Columbia, Canada, Society of Environmental Toxicology and Chemistry, Pensacola, Florida, 
Mhiaoui S, Sar F, Gasser J 2003, 'Influence of the History of a Melt on the Electrical Resistivity of Cadmium–Antimony Liquid Alloys', Intermetallics, vol. 11, nos 11–12, pp. 1377–82, 
Miller GJ, Lee C & Choe W 2002, 'Structure and Bonding Around the Zintl border', in G Meyer, D Naumann & L Wesermann (eds), Inorganic chemistry highlights, Wiley-VCH, Weinheim, pp. 21–53, 
Millot F, Rifflet JC, Sarou-Kanian V & Wille G 2002, 'High-Temperature Properties of Liquid Boron from Contactless Techniques', International Journal of Thermophysics, vol. 23, no. 5, pp. 1185–95, 
Mingos DMP 1998, Essential Trends in Inorganic Chemistry, Oxford University, Oxford, 
Moeller T 1954, Inorganic Chemistry: An Advanced Textbook, John Wiley & Sons, New York
Mokhatab S & Poe WA 2012, Handbook of Natural Gas Transmission and Processing, 2nd ed., Elsevier, Kidlington, Oxford, 
Molina-Quiroz RC, Muñoz-Villagrán CM, de la Torre E, Tantaleán JC, Vásquez CC & Pérez-Donoso JM 2012, 'Enhancing the Antibiotic Antibacterial Effect by Sub Lethal Tellurite Concentrations: Tellurite and Cefotaxime Act Synergistically in Escherichia Coli', PloS (Public Library of Science) ONE, vol. 7, no. 4, 
 Monconduit L, Evain M, Boucher F, Brec R & Rouxel J 1992, 'Short Te ... Te Bonding Contacts in a New Layered Ternary Telluride: Synthesis and crystal structure of 2D Nb3GexTe6 (x ≃ 0.9)', Zeitschrift für Anorganische und Allgemeine Chemie, vol. 616, no. 10, pp. 177–82, 
Moody B 1991, Comparative Inorganic Chemistry, 3rd ed., Edward Arnold, London, 
Moore LJ, Fassett JD, Travis JC, Lucatorto TB & Clark CW 1985, 'Resonance-Ionization Mass Spectrometry of Carbon', Journal of the Optical Society of America B, vol. 2, no. 9, pp. 1561–65, 
Moore JE 2010, 'The Birth of Topological Insulators,' Nature, vol. 464, pp. 194–98, 
Moore JE 2011, Topological insulators, IEEE Spectrum, viewed 15 December 2014
Moore JT 2011, Chemistry for Dummies, 2nd ed., John Wiley & Sons, New York, 
Moore NC 2014, '45-year Physics Mystery Shows a Path to Quantum Transistors', Michigan News, viewed 17 December 2014
Morgan WC 1906, Qualitative Analysis as a Laboratory Basis for the Study of General Inorganic Chemistry, The Macmillan Company, New York
Morita A 1986, 'Semiconducting Black Phosphorus', Journal of Applied Physics A, vol. 39, no. 4, pp. 227–42, 
Moss TS 1952, Photoconductivity in the Elements, London, Butterworths
Muncke J 2013, 'Antimony Migration from PET: New Study Investigates Extent of Antimony Migration from Polyethylene Terephthalate (PET) Using EU Migration Testing Rules', Food Packaging Forum, April 2
Murray JF 1928, 'Cable-Sheath Corrosion', Electrical World, vol. 92, Dec 29, pp. 1295–97, 
Nagao T, Sadowski1 JT, Saito M, Yaginuma S, Fujikawa Y, Kogure T, Ohno T, Hasegawa Y, Hasegawa S & Sakurai T 2004, 'Nanofilm Allotrope and Phase Transformation of Ultrathin Bi Film on Si(111)-7×7', Physical Review Letters, vol. 93, no. 10, pp. 105501–1–4, 
Neuburger MC 1936, 'Gitterkonstanten für das Jahr 1936' (in German), Zeitschrift für Kristallographie, vol. 93, pp. 1–36, 
Nickless G 1968, Inorganic Sulphur Chemistry, Elsevier, Amsterdam
Nielsen FH 1998, 'Ultratrace Elements in Nutrition: Current Knowledge and Speculation', The Journal of Trace Elements in Experimental Medicine, vol. 11, pp. 251–74, 
NIST (National Institute of Standards and Technology) 2010, Ground Levels and Ionization Energies for Neutral Atoms, by WC Martin, A Musgrove, S Kotochigova & JE Sansonetti, viewed 8 February 2013
National Research Council 1984, The Competitive Status of the U.S. Electronics Industry: A Study of the Influences of Technology in Determining International Industrial Competitive Advantage, National Academy Press, Washington, DC, New Scientist 1975, 'Chemistry on the Islands of Stability', 11 Sep, p. 574, 
New Scientist 2014, 'Colour-changing metal to yield thin, flexible displays', vol. 223, no. 2977
Oderberg DS 2007, Real Essentialism, Routledge, New York, Oxford English Dictionary 1989, 2nd ed., Oxford University, Oxford, 
Oganov AR, Chen J, Gatti C, Ma Y, Ma Y, Glass CW, Liu Z, Yu T, Kurakevych OO & Solozhenko VL 2009, 'Ionic High-Pressure Form of Elemental Boron', Nature, vol. 457, 12 Feb, pp. 863–68, 
Oganov AR 2010, 'Boron Under Pressure: Phase Diagram and Novel High Pressure Phase,' in N Ortovoskaya N & L Mykola L (eds), Boron Rich Solids: Sensors, Ultra High Temperature Ceramics, Thermoelectrics, Armor, Springer, Dordrecht, pp. 207–25, 
Ogata S, Li J & Yip S 2002, 'Ideal Pure Shear Strength of Aluminium and Copper', Science, vol. 298, no. 5594, 25 October, pp. 807–10, 
O'Hare D 1997, 'Inorganic intercalation compounds' in DW Bruce & D O'Hare (eds), Inorganic materials, 2nd ed., John Wiley & Sons, Chichester, pp. 171–254, 
Okajima Y & Shomoji M 1972, Viscosity of Dilute Amalgams', Transactions of the Japan Institute of Metals, vol. 13, no. 4, pp. 255–58, 
Oldfield JE, Allaway WH, HA Laitinen, HW Lakin & OH Muth 1974, 'Tellurium', in Geochemistry and the Environment, Volume 1: The Relation of Selected Trace Elements to Health and Disease, US National Committee for Geochemistry, Subcommittee on the Geochemical Environment in Relation to Health and Disease, National Academy of Sciences, Washington, 
Oliwenstein L 2011, 'Caltech-Led Team Creates Damage-Tolerant Metallic Glass', California Institute of Technology, 12 January, viewed 8 February 2013
Olmsted J & Williams GM 1997, Chemistry, the Molecular Science, 2nd ed., Wm C Brown, Dubuque, Iowa, 
Ordnance Office 1863, The Ordnance Manual for the use of the Officers of the Confederate States Army, 1st ed., Evans & Cogswell, Charleston, SC
Orton JW 2004, The Story of Semiconductors, Oxford University, Oxford, 
Owen SM & Brooker AT 1991, A Guide to Modern Inorganic Chemistry, Longman Scientific & Technical, Harlow, Essex, 
Oxtoby DW, Gillis HP & Campion A 2008, Principles of Modern Chemistry, 6th ed., Thomson Brooks/Cole, Belmont, California, 
 Pan K, Fu Y & Huang T 1964, 'Polarographic Behavior of Germanium(II)-Perchlorate in Perchloric Acid Solutions', Journal of the Chinese Chemical Society, pp. 176–84, 
Parise JB, Tan K, Norby P, Ko Y & Cahill C 1996, 'Examples of Hydrothermal Titration and Real Time X-ray Diffraction in the Synthesis of Open Frameworks', MRS Proceedings, vol. 453, pp. 103–14, 
Parish RV 1977, The Metallic Elements, Longman, London, 
Parkes GD & Mellor JW 1943, Mellor's Nodern Inorganic Chemistry, Longmans, Green and Co., London
Parry RW, Steiner LE, Tellefsen RL & Dietz PM 1970, Chemistry: Experimental Foundations, Prentice-Hall/Martin Educational, Sydney, 
Partington 1944, A Text-book of Inorganic Chemistry, 5th ed., Macmillan, London
Pashaey BP & Seleznev VV 1973, 'Magnetic Susceptibility of Gallium-Indium Alloys in Liquid State', Russian Physics Journal, vol. 16, no. 4, pp. 565–66, 
Patel MR 2012, Introduction to Electrical Power and Power Electronics CRC Press, Boca Raton, 
Paul RC, Puri JK, Sharma RD & Malhotra KC 1971, 'Unusual Cations of Arsenic', Inorganic and Nuclear Chemistry Letters, vol. 7, no. 8, pp. 725–28, 
Pauling L 1988, General Chemistry, Dover Publications, New York, 
Pearson WB 1972, The Crystal Chemistry and Physics of Metals and Alloys, Wiley-Interscience, New York, 
Perry DL 2011, Handbook of Inorganic Compounds, 2nd ed., CRC Press, Boca Raton, Florida, 
Peryea FJ 1998, 'Historical Use of Lead Arsenate Insecticides, Resulting Soil Contamination and Implications for Soil Remediation, Proceedings', 16th World Congress of Soil Science, Montpellier, France, 20–26 August
Phillips CSG & Williams RJP 1965, Inorganic Chemistry, I: Principles and Non-metals, Clarendon Press, Oxford
Pinkerton J 1800, Petralogy. A Treatise on Rocks, vol. 2, White, Cochrane, and Co., London
Poojary DM, Borade RB & Clearfield A 1993, 'Structural Characterization of Silicon Orthophosphate', Inorganica Chimica Acta, vol. 208, no. 1, pp. 23–29, 
Pourbaix M 1974, Atlas of Electrochemical Equilibria in Aqueous Solutions, 2nd English edition, National Association of Corrosion Engineers, Houston, 
Powell HM & Brewer FM 1938, 'The Structure of Germanous Iodide', Journal of the Chemical Society,, pp. 197–198, 
Powell P 1988, Principles of Organometallic Chemistry, Chapman and Hall, London, 
Prakash GKS & Schleyer PvR (eds) 1997, Stable Carbocation Chemistry, John Wiley & Sons, New York, 
Prudenziati M 1977, IV. 'Characterization of Localized States in β-Rhombohedral Boron', in VI Matkovich (ed.), Boron and Refractory Borides, Springer-Verlag, Berlin, pp. 241–61, 
Puddephatt RJ & Monaghan PK 1989, The Periodic Table of the Elements, 2nd ed., Oxford University, Oxford, 
Pyykkö P 2012, 'Relativistic Effects in Chemistry: More Common Than You Thought', Annual Review of Physical Chemistry, vol. 63, pp. 45‒64 (56), 
Rao CNR & Ganguly P 1986, 'A New Criterion for the Metallicity of Elements', Solid State Communications, vol. 57, no. 1, pp. 5–6, 
Rao KY 2002, Structural Chemistry of Glasses, Elsevier, Oxford, 
Rausch MD 1960, 'Cyclopentadienyl Compounds of Metals and Metalloids', Journal of Chemical Education, vol. 37, no. 11, pp. 568–78, 
Rayner-Canham G & Overton T 2006, Descriptive Inorganic Chemistry, 4th ed., WH Freeman, New York, 
Rayner-Canham G 2011, 'Isodiagonality in the Periodic Table', Foundations of chemistry, vol. 13, no. 2, pp. 121–29, 
Reardon M 2005, 'IBM Doubles Speed of Germanium chips', CNET News, August 4, viewed 27 December 2013
Regnault MV 1853, Elements of Chemistry, vol. 1, 2nd ed., Clark & Hesser, Philadelphia
Reilly C 2002, Metal Contamination of Food, Blackwell Science, Oxford, 
Reilly 2004, The Nutritional Trace Metals, Blackwell, Oxford, 
Restrepo G, Mesa H, Llanos EJ & Villaveces JL 2004, 'Topological Study of the Periodic System', Journal of Chemical Information and Modelling, vol. 44, no. 1, pp. 68–75, 
Restrepo G, Llanos EJ & Mesa H 2006, 'Topological Space of the Chemical Elements and its Properties', Journal of Mathematical Chemistry, vol. 39, no. 2, pp. 401–16, 
Řezanka T & Sigler K 2008, 'Biologically Active Compounds of Semi-Metals', Studies in Natural Products Chemistry, vol. 35, pp. 585–606, 
Richens DT 1997, The Chemistry of Aqua Ions, John Wiley & Sons, Chichester, 
Rochow EG 1957, The Chemistry of Organometallic Compounds, John Wiley & Sons, New York
Rochow EG 1966, The Metalloids, DC Heath and Company, Boston
Rochow EG 1973, 'Silicon', in JC Bailar, HJ Emeléus, R Nyholm & AF Trotman-Dickenson (eds), Comprehensive Inorganic Chemistry, vol. 1, Pergamon, Oxford, pp. 1323–1467, 
Rochow EG 1977, Modern Descriptive Chemistry, Saunders, Philadelphia, 
Rodgers G 2011, Descriptive Inorganic, Coordination, & Solid-state Chemistry, Brooks/Cole, Belmont, CA, 
Roher GS 2001, Structure and Bonding in Crystalline Materials, Cambridge University Press, Cambridge, 
Rossler K 1985, 'Handling of Astatine', pp. 140–56, in Kugler & Keller
Rothenberg GB 1976, Glass Technology, Recent Developments, Noyes Data Corporation, Park Ridge, New Jersey, 
Roza G 2009, Bromine, Rosen Publishing, New York, 
 Rupar PA, Staroverov VN & Baines KM 2008, 'A Cryptand-Encapsulated Germanium(II) Dication', Science, vol. 322, no. 5906, pp. 1360–63, 
Russell AM & Lee KL 2005, Structure-Property Relations in Nonferrous Metals, Wiley-Interscience, New York, 
Russell MS 2009, The Chemistry of Fireworks, 2nd ed., Royal Society of Chemistry, 
Sacks MD 1998, 'Mullitization Behavior of Alpha Alumina Silica Microcomposite Powders', in AP Tomsia & AM Glaeser (eds), Ceramic Microstructures: Control at the Atomic Level, proceedings of the International Materials Symposium on Ceramic Microstructures '96: Control at the Atomic Level, June 24–27, 1996, Berkeley, CA, Plenum Press, New York, pp. 285–302, 
Salentine CG 1987, 'Synthesis, Characterization, and Crystal Structure of a New Potassium Borate, KB3O5•3H2O', Inorganic Chemistry, vol. 26, no. 1, pp. 128–32, 
Samsonov GV 1968, Handbook of the Physiochemical Properties of the Elements, I F I/Plenum, New York
Savvatimskiy AI 2005, 'Measurements of the Melting Point of Graphite and the Properties of Liquid Carbon (a review for 1963–2003)', Carbon, vol. 43, no. 6, pp. 1115–42, 
Savvatimskiy AI 2009, 'Experimental Electrical Resistivity of Liquid Carbon in the Temperature Range from 4800 to ~20,000 K', Carbon, vol. 47, no. 10, pp. 2322–8, 
Schaefer JC 1968, 'Boron' in CA Hampel (ed.), The Encyclopedia of the Chemical Elements, Reinhold, New York, pp. 73–81
Schauss AG 1991, 'Nephrotoxicity and Neurotoxicity in Humans from Organogermanium Compounds and Germanium Dioxide', Biological Trace Element Research, vol. 29, no. 3, pp. 267–80, 
Schmidbaur H & Schier A 2008, 'A Briefing on Aurophilicity,' Chemical Society Reviews, vol. 37, pp. 1931–51, 
Schroers J 2013, 'Bulk Metallic Glasses', Physics Today, vol. 66, no. 2, pp. 32–37, 
Schwab GM & Gerlach J 1967, 'The Reaction of Germanium with Molybdenum(VI) Oxide in the Solid State' (in German), Zeitschrift für Physikalische Chemie, vol. 56, pp. 121–32, 
Schwartz MM 2002, Encyclopedia of Materials, Parts, and Finishes, 2nd ed., CRC Press, Boca Raton, Florida, 
Schwietzer GK and Pesterfield LL 2010, The Aqueous Chemistry of the Elements, Oxford University, Oxford, ScienceDaily 2012, 'Recharge Your Cell Phone With a Touch? New nanotechnology converts body heat into power', February 22, viewed 13 January 2013
Scott EC & Kanda FA 1962, The Nature of Atoms and Molecules: A General Chemistry, Harper & Row, New York
Secrist JH & Powers WH 1966, General Chemistry, D. Van Nostrand, Princeton, New Jersey
Segal BG 1989, Chemistry: Experiment and Theory, 2nd ed., John Wiley & Sons, New York, 
Sekhon BS 2012, 'Metalloid Compounds as Drugs', Research in Pharmaceutical Sciences, vol. 8, no. 3, pp. 145–58, 
Sequeira CAC 2011, 'Copper and Copper Alloys', in R Winston Revie (ed.), Uhlig's Corrosion Handbook, 3rd ed., John Wiley & Sons, Hoboken, New Jersey, pp. 757–86, 
Sharp DWA 1981, 'Metalloids', in Miall's Dictionary of Chemistry, 5th ed, Longman, Harlow, 
Sharp DWA 1983, The Penguin Dictionary of Chemistry, 2nd ed., Harmondsworth, Middlesex, 
Shelby JE 2005, Introduction to Glass Science and Technology, 2nd ed., Royal Society of Chemistry, Cambridge, 
Sidgwick NV 1950, The Chemical Elements and Their Compounds, vol. 1, Clarendon, Oxford
Siebring BR 1967, Chemistry, MacMillan, New York
Siekierski S & Burgess J 2002, Concise Chemistry of the Elements, Horwood, Chichester, 
Silberberg MS 2006, Chemistry: The Molecular Nature of Matter and Change, 4th ed., McGraw-Hill, New York, 
Simple Memory Art c. 2005, Periodic Table, EVA vinyl shower curtain, San Francisco
Skinner GRB, Hartley CE, Millar D & Bishop E 1979, 'Possible Treatment for Cold Sores,' British Medical Journal, vol 2, no. 6192, p. 704, 
Slade S 2006, Elements and the Periodic Table, The Rosen Publishing Group, New York, 
Science Learning Hub 2009, 'The Essential Elements', The University of Waikato, viewed 16 January 2013
Smith DW 1990, Inorganic Substances: A Prelude to the Study of Descriptive Inorganic Chemistry, Cambridge University, Cambridge, 
Smith R 1994, Conquering Chemistry, 2nd ed., McGraw-Hill, Sydney, 
Smith AH, Marshall G, Yuan Y, Steinmaus C, Liaw J, Smith MT, Wood L, Heirich M, Fritzemeier RM, Pegram MD & Ferreccio C 2014, 'Rapid Reduction in Breast Cancer Mortality with Inorganic Arsenic in Drinking Water', "EBioMedicine," 
Sneader W 2005, Drug Discovery: A History, John Wiley & Sons, New York, 
Snyder MK 1966, Chemistry: Structure and Reactions, Holt, Rinehart and Winston, New York
Soverna S 2004, 'Indication for a Gaseous Element 112', in U Grundinger (ed.), GSI Scientific Report 2003, GSI Report 2004–1, p. 187, 
Steele D 1966, The Chemistry of the Metallic Elements, Pergamon Press, Oxford
Stein L 1985, 'New Evidence that Radon is a Metalloid Element: Ion-Exchange Reactions of Cationic Radon', Journal of the Chemical Society, Chemical Communications, vol. 22, pp. 1631–32, 
Stein L 1987, 'Chemical Properties of Radon' in PK Hopke (ed.) 1987, Radon and its Decay products: Occurrence, Properties, and Health Effects, American Chemical Society, Washington DC, pp. 240–51, 
Steudel R 1977, Chemistry of the Non-metals: With an Introduction to atomic Structure and Chemical Bonding, Walter de Gruyter, Berlin, 
Steurer W 2007, 'Crystal Structures of the Elements' in JW Marin (ed.), Concise Encyclopedia of the Structure of Materials, Elsevier, Oxford, pp. 127–45, 
Stevens SD & Klarner A 1990, Deadly Doses: A Writer's Guide to Poisons, Writer's Digest Books, Cincinnati, Ohio, 
Stoker HS 2010, General, Organic, and Biological Chemistry, 5th ed., Brooks/Cole, Cengage Learning, Belmont California, 
Stott RW 1956, A Companion to Physical and Inorganic Chemistry, Longmans, Green and Co., London
Stuke J 1974, 'Optical and Electrical Properties of Selenium', in RA Zingaro & WC Cooper (eds), Selenium, Van Nostrand Reinhold, New York, pp. 174–297, 
Swalin RA 1962, Thermodynamics of Solids, John Wiley & Sons, New York
Swift EH & Schaefer WP 1962, Qualitative Elemental Analysis, WH Freeman, San Francisco
Swink LN & Carpenter GB 1966, 'The Crystal Structure of Basic Tellurium Nitrate, Te2O4•HNO3', Acta Crystallographica, vol. 21, no. 4, pp. 578–83, 
Szpunar J, Bouyssiere B & Lobinski R 2004, 'Advances in Analytical Methods for Speciation of Trace Elements in the Environment', in AV Hirner & H Emons (eds), Organic Metal and Metalloid Species in the Environment: Analysis, Distribution Processes and Toxicological Evaluation, Springer-Verlag, Berlin, pp. 17–40, 
Taguena-Martinez J, Barrio RA & Chambouleyron I 1991, 'Study of Tin in Amorphous Germanium', in JA Blackman & J Tagüeña (eds), Disorder in Condensed Matter Physics: A Volume in Honour of Roger Elliott, Clarendon Press, Oxford, pp. 139–44
Taniguchi M, Suga S, Seki M, Sakamoto H, Kanzaki H, Akahama Y, Endo S, Terada S & Narita S 1984, 'Core-Exciton Induced Resonant Photoemission in the Covalent Semiconductor Black Phosphorus', Solid State Communications, vo1. 49, no. 9, pp. 867–70
Tao SH & Bolger PM 1997, 'Hazard Assessment of Germanium Supplements', Regulatory Toxicology and Pharmacology, vol. 25, no. 3, pp. 211–19, 
Taylor MD 1960, First Principles of Chemistry, D. Van Nostrand, Princeton, New Jersey
Thayer JS 1977, 'Teaching Bio-Organometal Chemistry. I. The Metalloids', Journal of Chemical Education, vol. 54, no. 10, pp. 604–06, The Economist 2012, 'Phase-Change Memory: Altered States', Technology Quarterly, September 1
The American Heritage Science Dictionary 2005, Houghton Mifflin Harcourt, Boston, The Chemical News 1897, 'Notices of Books: A Manual of Chemistry, Theoretical and Practical, by WA Tilden', vol. 75, no. 1951, p. 189
Thomas S & Visakh PM 2012, Handbook of Engineering and Speciality Thermoplastics: Volume 3: Polyethers and Polyesters, John Wiley & Sons, Hoboken, New Jersey, 
Tilden WA 1876, Introduction to the Study of Chemical Philosophy, D. Appleton and Co., New York
Timm JA 1944, General Chemistry, McGraw-Hill, New York
Tyler Miller G 1987, Chemistry: A Basic Introduction, 4th ed., Wadsworth Publishing Company, Belmont, California, 
Togaya M 2000, 'Electrical Resistivity of Liquid Carbon at High Pressure', in MH Manghnani, W Nellis & MF.Nicol (eds), Science and Technology of High Pressure, proceedings of AIRAPT-17, Honolulu, Hawaii, 25–30 July 1999, vol. 2, Universities Press, Hyderabad, pp. 871–74, 
Tom LWC, Elden LM & Marsh RR 2004, 'Topical antifungals', in PS Roland & JA Rutka, Ototoxicity, BC Decker, Hamilton, Ontario, pp. 134–39, 
Tominaga J 2006, 'Application of Ge–Sb–Te Glasses for Ultrahigh Density Optical Storage', in AV Kolobov (ed.), Photo-Induced Metastability in Amorphous Semiconductors, Wiley-VCH, pp. 327–27, 
Toy AD 1975, The Chemistry of Phosphorus, Pergamon, Oxford, 
Träger F 2007, Springer Handbook of Lasers and Optics, Springer, New York, 
Traynham JG 1989, 'Carbonium Ion: Waxing and Waning of a Name', Journal of Chemical Education, vol. 63, no. 11, pp. 930–33, 
Trivedi Y, Yung E & Katz DS 2013, 'Imaging in Fever of Unknown Origin', in BA Cunha (ed.), Fever of Unknown Origin, Informa Healthcare USA, New York, pp. 209–28, 
Turner M 2011, 'German E. Coli Outbreak Caused by Previously Unknown Strain', Nature News, 2 Jun, 
Turova N 2011, Inorganic Chemistry in Tables, Springer, Heidelberg, 
Tuthill G 2011, 'Faculty profile: Elements of Great Teaching', The Iolani School Bulletin, Winter, viewed 29 October 2011
Tyler PM 1948, From the Ground Up: Facts and Figures of the Mineral Industries of the United States, McGraw-Hill, New York
UCR Today 2011, 'Research Performed in Guy Bertrand's Lab Offers Vast Family of New Catalysts for use in Drug Discovery, Biotechnology', University of California, Riverside, July 28
Uden PC 2005, 'Speciation of Selenium,' in R Cornelis, J Caruso, H Crews & K Heumann (eds), Handbook of Elemental Speciation II: Species in the Environment, Food, Medicine and Occupational Health, John Wiley & Sons, Chichester, pp. 346–65, 
United Nuclear Scientific 2014, 'Disk Sources, Standard', viewed 5 April 2014
US Bureau of Naval Personnel 1965, Shipfitter 3 & 2, US Government Printing Office, Washington
US Environmental Protection Agency 1988, Ambient Aquatic Life Water Quality Criteria for Antimony (III), draft, Office of Research and Development, Environmental Research Laboratories, Washington
University of Limerick 2014, 'Researchers make breakthrough in battery technology,' 7 February, viewed 2 March 2014
University of Utah 2014, New 'Topological Insulator' Could Lead to Superfast Computers, Phys.org, viewed 15 December 2014
Van Muylder J & Pourbaix M 1974, 'Arsenic', in M Pourbaix (ed.), Atlas of Electrochemical Equilibria in Aqueous Solutions, 2nd ed., National Association of Corrosion Engineers, Houston
Van der Put PJ 1998, The Inorganic Chemistry of Materials: How to Make Things Out of Elements, Plenum, New York, 
Van Setten MJ, Uijttewaal MA, de Wijs GA & Groot RA 2007, 'Thermodynamic Stability of Boron: The Role of Defects and Zero Point Motion', Journal of the American Chemical Society, vol. 129, no. 9, pp. 2458–65, 
Vasáros L & Berei K 1985, 'General Properties of Astatine', pp. 107–28, in Kugler & Keller
Vernon RE 2013, 'Which Elements Are Metalloids?', Journal of Chemical Education, vol. 90, no. 12, pp. 1703–07, 
Walker P & Tarn WH 1996, CRC Handbook of Metal Etchants, Boca Raton, FL, 
Walters D 1982, Chemistry, Franklin Watts Science World series, Franklin Watts, London, 
Wang Y & Robinson GH 2011, 'Building a Lewis Base with Boron', Science, vol. 333, no. 6042, pp. 530–31, 
Wanga WH, Dongb C & Shek CH 2004, 'Bulk Metallic Glasses', Materials Science and Engineering Reports, vol. 44, nos 2–3, pp. 45–89, 
Warren J & Geballe T 1981, 'Research Opportunities in New Energy-Related Materials', Materials Science and Engineering, vol. 50, no. 2, pp. 149–98, 
Weingart GW 1947, Pyrotechnics, 2nd ed., Chemical Publishing Company, New York
Wells AF 1984, Structural Inorganic Chemistry, 5th ed., Clarendon, Oxford, 
Whitten KW, Davis RE, Peck LM & Stanley GG 2007, Chemistry, 8th ed., Thomson Brooks/Cole, Belmont, California, 
Wiberg N 2001, Inorganic Chemistry, Academic Press, San Diego, 
Wilkie CA & Morgan AB 2009, Fire Retardancy of Polymeric Materials, CRC Press, Boca Raton, Florida, 
Witt AF & Gatos HC 1968, 'Germanium', in CA Hampel (ed.), The Encyclopedia of the Chemical Elements, Reinhold, New York, pp. 237–44
Wogan T 2014, "First experimental evidence of a boron fullerene", Chemistry World, 14 July
Woodward WE 1948, Engineering Metallurgy, Constable, London
WPI-AIM (World Premier Institute – Advanced Institute for Materials Research) 2012, 'Bulk Metallic Glasses: An Unexpected Hybrid', AIMResearch, Tohoku University, Sendai, Japan, 30 April
Wulfsberg G 2000, Inorganic Chemistry, University Science Books, Sausalito California, 
Xu Y, Miotkowski I, Liu C, Tian J, Nam H, Alidoust N, Hu J, Shih C-K, Hasan M &  Chen YP 2014, 'Observation of Topological Surface State Quantum Hall Effect in an Intrinsic Three-dimensional Topological Insulator,' Nature Physics,  vol, 10, pp. 956–63, 
Yacobi BG & Holt DB 1990, Cathodoluminescence Microscopy of Inorganic Solids, Plenum, New York, 
Yang K, Setyawan W, Wang S, Nardelli MB & Curtarolo S 2012, 'A Search Model for Topological Insulators with High-throughput Robustness Descriptors,' Nature Materials, vol. 11, pp. 614–19, 
Yasuda E, Inagaki M, Kaneko K, Endo M, Oya A & Tanabe Y 2003, Carbon Alloys: Novel Concepts to Develop Carbon Science and Technology, Elsevier Science, Oxford, pp. 3–11 et seq, 
Yetter RA 2012, Nanoengineered Reactive Materials and their Combustion and Synthesis, course notes, Princeton-CEFRC Summer School On Combustion, June 25–29, 2012, Penn State University
Young RV & Sessine S (eds) 2000, World of Chemistry, Gale Group, Farmington Hills, Michigan, 
Young TF, Finley K, Adams WF, Besser J, Hopkins WD, Jolley D, McNaughton E, Presser TS, Shaw DP & Unrine J 2010, 'What You Need to Know About Selenium', in PM Chapman, WJ Adams, M Brooks, CJ Delos, SN Luoma, WA Maher, H Ohlendorf, TS Presser & P Shaw (eds), Ecological Assessment of Selenium in the Aquatic Environment, CRC, Boca Raton, Florida, pp. 7–45, 
Zalutsky MR & Pruszynski M 2011, 'Astatine-211: Production and Availability', Current Radiopharmaceuticals, vol. 4, no. 3, pp. 177–85, 
Zhang GX 2002, 'Dissolution and Structures of Silicon Surface', in MJ Deen, D Misra & J Ruzyllo (eds), Integrated Optoelectronics: Proceedings of the First International Symposium, Philadelphia, PA, The Electrochemical Society, Pennington, NJ, pp. 63–78, 
Zhang TC, Lai KCK & Surampalli AY 2008, 'Pesticides', in A Bhandari, RY Surampalli, CD Adams, P Champagne, SK Ong, RD Tyagi & TC Zhang (eds), Contaminants of Emerging Environmental Concern, American Society of Civil Engineers, Reston, Virginia, pp. 343–415
Zhdanov GS 1965, Crystal Physics, translated from the Russian publication of 1961 by AF Brown (ed.), Oliver & Boyd, Edinburgh
Zingaro RA 1994, 'Arsenic: Inorganic Chemistry', in RB King (ed.) 1994, Encyclopedia of Inorganic Chemistry, John Wiley & Sons, Chichester, pp. 192–218, 

Further reading
Brady JE, Humiston GE & Heikkinen H (1980), "Chemistry of the Representative Elements: Part II, The Metalloids and Nonmetals", in General Chemistry: Principles and Structure, 2nd ed., SI version, John Wiley & Sons, New York, pp. 537–91, 
Chedd G (1969), Half-way Elements: The Technology of Metalloids, Doubleday, New York
Choppin GR & Johnsen RH (1972), "Group IV and the Metalloids", in Introductory Chemistry, Addison-Wesley, Reading, Massachusetts, pp. 341–57
Dunstan S (1968), "The Metalloids", in Principles of Chemistry, D. Van Nostrand Company, London, pp. 407–39
Goldsmith RH (1982), "Metalloids", Journal of Chemical Education, vol. 59, no. 6, pp. 526527, 
Hawkes SJ (2001), "Semimetallicity", Journal of Chemical Education, vol. 78, no. 12, pp. 1686–87, 
Metcalfe HC, Williams JE & Castka JF (1974), "Aluminum and the Metalloids", in Modern Chemistry, Holt, Rinehart and Winston, New York, pp. 538–57, 
Miller JS (2019), "Viewpoint: Metalloids – An Electronic Band Structure Perspective", Chemistry – A European Perspective, preprint version,  
Moeller T, Bailar JC, Kleinberg J, Guss CO, Castellion ME & Metz C (1989), "Carbon and the Semiconducting Elements", in Chemistry, with Inorganic Qualitative Analysis, 3rd ed., Harcourt Brace Jovanovich, San Diego, pp. 742–75, 
Parveen N et al. (2020), "Metalloids in plants: A systematic discussion beyond description", Annals of Applied Biology,  
Rieske M (1998), "Metalloids", in Encyclopedia of Earth and Physical Sciences, Marshall Cavendish, New York, vol. 6, pp. 758–59,  (set)
Rochow EG (1966), The Metalloids, DC Heath and Company, Boston
Vernon RE (2013), "Which Elements are Metalloids?", Journal of Chemical Education, vol. 90, no. 12, pp. 1703–07, 
—— (2020,) "Organising the Metals and Nonmetals", Foundations of Chemistry,'' (open access)

 

Periodic table